= Marine worm =

Any worm living in a marine environment

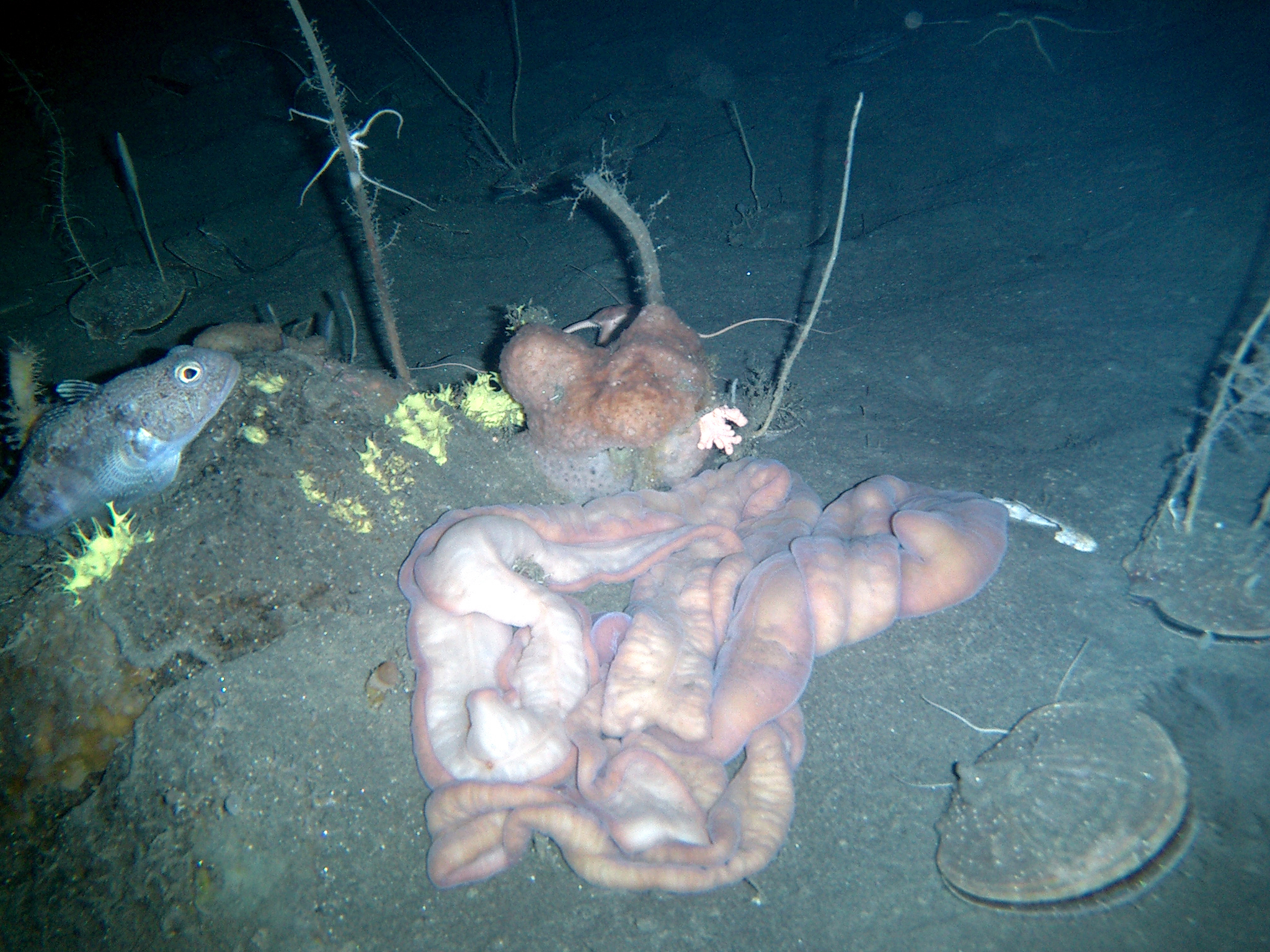
A large marine worm, Parborlasia corrugatus lives at depths of up to 3,590 m (11,780 ft) in the ocean around Antarctica.

Any worm that lives in a marine environment is considered a sea or marine worm. Marine worms are found in several different phyla, including the Platyhelminthes, Nematoda, Annelida (segmented worms), Chaetognatha, Hemichordata, and Phoronida.

== Reproduction ==
Marine worms exhibit numerous types of reproduction, both sexually and asexually. Asexually many are able to reproduce via budding or regeneration. This regeneration is most notably studied in Plathelminths or Triclad, known for being one of the earliest animals to be studied for its regenerative capabilities. Marine worms will also sexually reproduce, internally and externally, with some releasing spawn into the ocean currents. This is in opposition to the much more internal and invasive method displayed by flat-worms called Penis fencing where hermaphroditic organisms will fight to try and impregnate their opponent while avoiding becoming impregnated. This method is driven by the biological disadvantages (such as resource need and energy expenditure) behind carrying offspring instead of the more prolific gene passage through multiple impregnations.

== Genetics and taxonomy ==
Polynoid scale worms are estimated to have arrived in deep sea ecosystems around sixty million years ago. Through the comparison of 120 genes, researchers came to the conclusion that genes related to DNA repair, recombination, and integration were only present in the deep sea polynoidae, which correlates with the idea that they have to adapt to deal with potential hypoxia in deep sea environments.

== Feeding methods ==
Marine worms can be herbivores, carnivores, parasites, detritivores, or filter feeders, but many strange examples of feeding are seen in this diverse type of animal. The group of Siboglinidae have developed a relationship with symbiotic bacteria within their gut that often perform chemosynthesis from which the worm benefits. These bacteria reside in a specialized organ called the Trophosome. Some worms have an extendable pharynx or a proboscis for consuming prey, while others have developed jaws.

== Circulation ==
Marine worms have a variety of circulation and respiration processes. For example, in platyhelminths this is achieved through diffusion of oxygen (as well as other nutrients) across a moist epithelial layer, whereas annelids have a closed circulatory system with blood vessels lining the body.

Many of these worms have specialized tentacles used for exchanging oxygen and carbon dioxide which also may be used for reproduction. These specialized tentacles allow for gas exchange, further decreasing oxygen content in dead zones and in shallow water, which encourages plant and algae growth.

This quality is also observed in deeper oceans, where tube worms that use respiratory plumes with tentacles perform gas exchange of hydrogen sulfide and methane around hydrothermal vents. These types of circulatory systems differ from marine worms previously mentioned that can perform gas exchange through their entire bodies. This synapomorphy of gas exchange causes even related terrestrial annelids to be restricted to moist environments.

== Environmental niches ==
Marine worms are known to inhabit many different environments, having been found in both fresh and saltwater habitats globally.

Some marine worms are tube worms, of which the giant tube worm lives in waters near underwater volcanoes and can withstand temperatures up to 90 °C (194 °F). They share this space with fellow polychaetas known as "pompeii worms" that can resist 105 °C waters coming out of vents for short periods of time, making them one of the most heat resistant animals ever recorded (Islam and Schulze-Makuch, 2007).

Some worms can live in extremely deep oceanic trenches, such as in the Pacific Ocean off the Galápagos Islands.

Marine deep sea polychaetes under the genus Osedax will colonize at whale falls in many different oceans, using a symbiont that can digest the bones within the carcasses (Jones et al., 2007) This earned them the common name of "boneworms," and they are speculated to be a keystone species of these types of environments due to lack of organisms in whale falls without observed Osedax worms. These whale falls remain undigested for many more years than those observed with marine worm cultivations.

In recent years, marine worms (especially those found in the ocean) have been observed ingesting microplastic particles found in the oceans. This trend is concerning many scientists, as marine worms act as an important food source for many fish and wading birds. Marine worms are often keystone species in an ecosystem, and the introduction of plastic in the oceans not only diminishes the growth rates of the marine worms, but also affects the food chain of that ecosystem.
