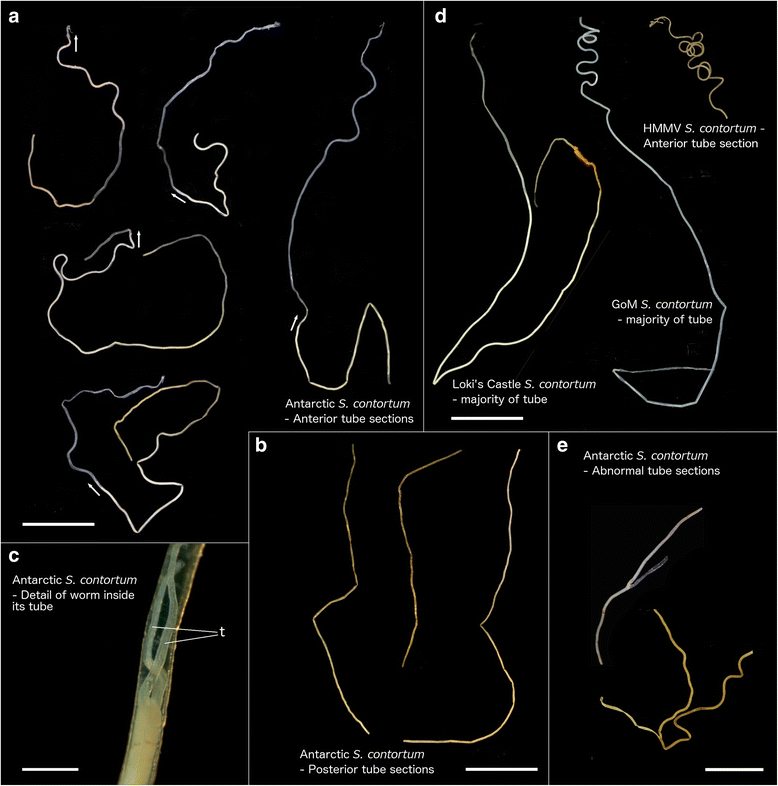
- Sclerolinum contortum specimen from a deep-sea environment

Scientific classification
- Kingdom: Animalia
- Phylum: Annelida
- Clade: Pleistoannelida
- Clade: Sedentaria
- Order: Sabellida
- Family: Siboglinidae
- Genus: Sclerolinum
- Species: S. contortum

Binomial name
- Sclerolinum contortum Smirnov, 2000

= Sclerolinum contortum =

Species of annelid

Sclerolinum contortum is a species of deep-sea tubeworm belonging to the family Siboglinidae. It is a small, slender annelid that lives along hydrothermal vents, cold seeps, and organic falls, where it relies on symbiotic bacteria for nutrition.

== Anatomy and morphology ==
S. contortum is a thin, tube-dwelling worm characterized by a long body enclosed within a chitinous tube as shown in Figure 1. Like other siboglinids, it lacks a digestive system as an adult and instead houses sulfur-oxidizing symbiotic bacteria in a specialized organ known as the trophosome.

The body is divided into four parts: the cephalic lobe (head region), the forepart, the trunk, and the opisthosoma (posterior anchoring region). Sclerolinum species do not display separation between the body regions, distinguishing them from related groups. The worm's tube is wiry and flexible, allowing it to inhabit many different habitats. They have an average diameter of 0.20 mm - 0.39 mm with a maximum length of about 70 mm.

Sexual dimorphism is not well documented amongst the worms; males and females appear similar externally; however, males have ciliated grooves from their gonopores, while females do not.

== Distribution and habitat ==
S. contortum is widely distributed across the entire planet and is considered a bipolar species. It was first documented on the Haakon Mosby Mud Volcano, off the northwestern coast of Norway. They can be found along hydrothermal vents, cold seeps, and organic falls. This species has been found at depths from 500 m to about 2000m.

=== Chemosynthetic ecosystems ===
Deep-sea chemosynthetic ecosystems were assumed heterotrophic until the discovery of deep-sea hydrothermal vents. After the discovery of hydrothermal vents, we discovered that vents could hold high productivity chemosynthetic communities with very complex structures. Hydrothermal vents are typically found on mid-ocean ridges and in back arc basins and can reach temperatures of up to 407 degrees Celsius. The vents discharge metal rich fluid containing macronutrients like iron and sulfur, which microbes use to create energy. Hydrothermal vents are also known to have large amounts of biodiversity and support many organisms like crabs, shrimp, clams, mussels, worms, and fishes.

Cold seep communities were discovered after hydrothermal vents. Cold seeps are described as the upward flux of cold fluids enriched in methane, as well as high concentrations of sulfide in surrounding sediments. The macrofauna within cold seeps are very similar to those within hydrothermal vents however the species and the way the communities are structured differ.

Organic falls are the final ecosystem consisting of this species. Organic falls consist of kelp, wood, large fish, or whales. Microbes break down lipids within the falls which creates similar compounds to those you would find from a seep or vent, and organisms use these same compounds in the same way they would from a vent to create energy. It is thought that organic falls may be a bridge between deep sea environments, but it is not yet proven. And in the same way as seeps, organic falls consist of similar macrofauna to vents differing in species and communal structure.

== Symbiosis and nutrition ==
As previously stated, S. contortum relies on symbiotic bacteria for nutrition. Instead, they use a sulfur oxidizing bacteria stored internally in the trophosome. The bacteria oxidize and reduce hydrogen sulfide to produce energy. This energy is used to fix carbon dioxide to organic molecules that nourish the host worm. As a result, S. contortum is entirely dependent on its symbionts for nutrition, highlighting the adaptation to deep-sea environments in the absence of sunlight.

== Behavior ==
Little behavioral observation exists due to the difficulties of the habitat they live in. What is known is that they remain sessile as adults, with their posterior end buried in the sediment while their anterior end is exposed to seawater. Reproduction is not well documented.

== Taxonomy ==
First described by Smirnov in 2000, it belongs to the family Siboglinidae, a group of annelids that includes vestimentiferan tubeworms, frenulates, and Osedax. Siboglinidae worms are all in the same group together as they all rely on symbiotic bacteria to gain nutrients. While the taxonomy of Sclerolinum is controversial, they have been classified in many different ways, as part of the frenulate worms, in their own family, Sclerolinidae, or in a distinct subclass. Future genetic studies will allow for more accurate taxonomic placement.

== Methods of study ==
Due to its deep-sea habitat, it is difficult to directly observe Sclerolinum contortum, and most knowledge of the species has been obtained through specialized sampling and imaging techniques. Researchers use remotely operated vehicles (ROVs) and deep-sea submersibles to locate and collect specimens from their deep-sea habitats. Once collected, specimens are analyzed using microscopy, including light and electron microscopy, to examine internal structures. DNA sequencing and phylogenetic analysis are also widely used to investigate the genetic relationships among deep-sea tube worm species. In addition, on site imaging has provided visual documentation of general tubeworm aggregations and overall morphology in their natural setting.
