= Marine microbial symbiosis =

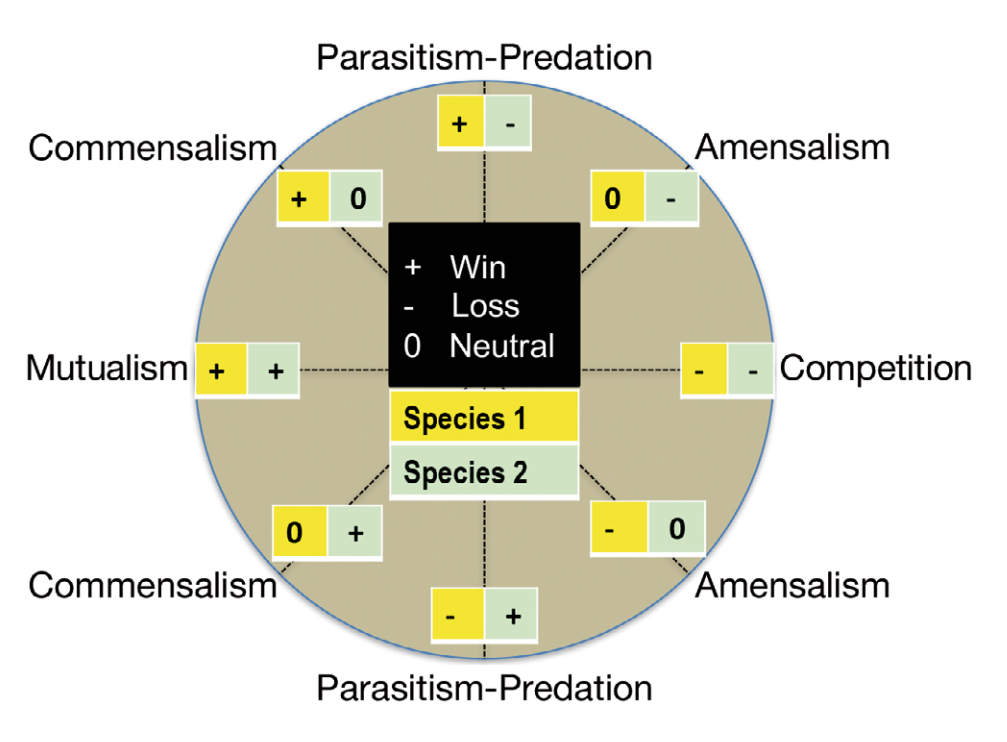
Possible ecological interactions between two individuals. The result of the interaction for each member of the pair can be positive, negative or neutral. For example, in predation, one partner obtains the benefits while the other assumes the costs.

Microbial symbiosis in marine animals was not discovered until 1981. In the time following, symbiotic relationships between marine invertebrates and chemoautotrophic bacteria have been found in a variety of ecosystems, ranging from shallow coastal waters to deep-sea hydrothermal vents. Symbiosis is a way for marine organisms to find creative ways to survive in a very dynamic environment. They are different in relation to how dependent the organisms are on each other or how they are associated. It is also considered a selective force behind evolution in some scientific aspects. The symbiotic relationships of organisms has the ability to change behavior, morphology and metabolic pathways. With increased recognition and research, new terminology also arises, such as holobiont, which the relationship between a host and its symbionts as one grouping. Many scientists will look at the hologenome, which is the combined genetic information of the host and its symbionts. These terms are more commonly used to describe microbial symbionts.

The type of marine animal vary greatly, for example, sponges, sea squirts, corals, worms, and algae all host a variety of unique symbionts. Each symbiotic relationship displays a unique ecological niche, which in turn can lead to entirely new species of host species and symbiont.

It is particularly interesting that it took so long to discover the marine microbial symbiosis because nearly every surface submerged in the oceans becomes covered with biofilm, including a large number of living organisms. Many marine organisms display symbiotic relationships with microbes. Epibiotic bacteria have been found to live on crustacean larvae and protect them from fungal infections. Other microbes in deep-sea vents have been found to prevent the settlement of barnacles and tunicate larvae.

== Mechanisms of symbiosis ==
Various mechanisms are utilized in order to facilitate symbiotic relationships and to help these associates evolve alongside one another. By using horizontal gene transfer, certain genetic elements are able to pass from one organisms to another. In non-mating species, this helps with genetic differentiation and adaptive evolution. An example of this is the sponge Astroclera willeyana which has a gene that is used in expressing spherulite-forming cells which has an origin in bacteria. Another example is the starlet sea anemone, Nematostella vectensis, which has genes from bacteria that have a role in producing UV radiation protection in the form of shikimic acid. Another way for symbiotic relationships to co-evolve is through genome erosion. This is a process where genes that are typically used during free-living periods aren't necessary because of the symbioses of the organisms. Without that gene, the organism is able to decrease the energy necessary for cell maintenance and replication.

== Types of symbiotic relationships ==
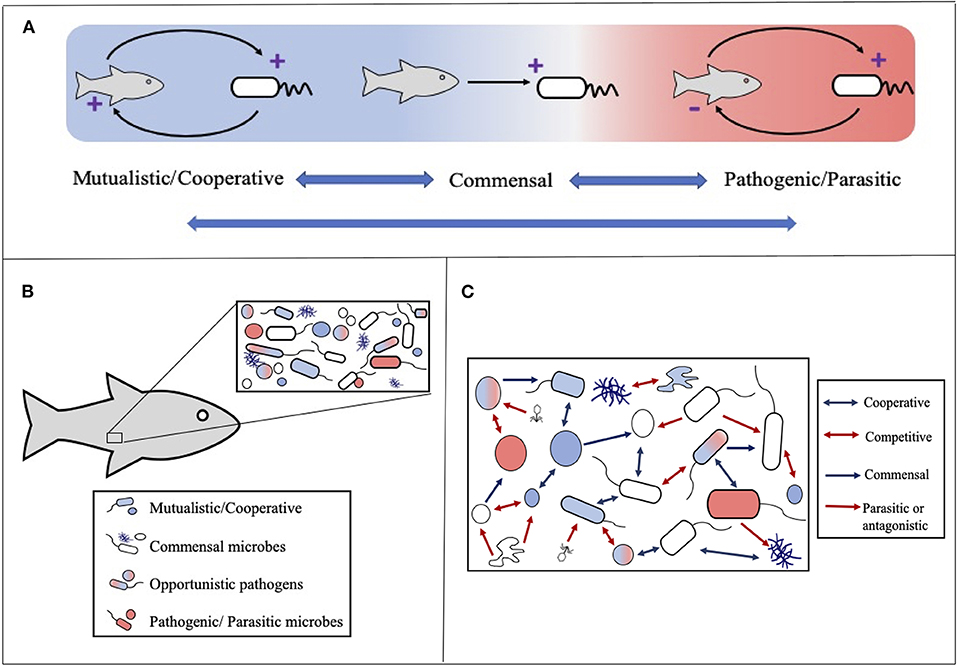
Main types of microbial symbioses (A) Microbial interactions range from mutually beneficial to harmful for one or more partners. Blue double headed arrows highlight that relationships can move between classifications often influenced by environmental conditions. (B) Host-microbe symbioses should be considered within the context of microbial communities where the host participates in multiple and often different symbiotic relationships. (C) Microbial communities are influenced by a variety of microbe-microbe symbioses ranging from cooperation (e.g., syntrophy or co-metabolism) to competition. Arrows depict generally beneficial (blue) and detrimental (red) outcomes for one (single arrowhead) or both (double arrowhead) members. Note as with host-microbe symbioses these relationships can be viewed as fluid and influenced by environmental conditions.

There are a variety of symbiotic relationships:

- Mutualism is a relationship in which both partners benefit.
- Commensalism is a relationship where one partner receives a benefit while the other is not affected.
- Parasitism is where one partner benefits at the expense of the host.
- Amensalism is a less common type of relationship where one organisms receives no benefit but the other still has negative ramifications.

The relationship can be either an ectosymbiont, a symbiont that survives by being attached to the surface of the host, which includes areas such as the inner surfaces of the gut cavity, or even the ducts of endocrine glands; or an endosymbiont, a symbiont that lives within its host and can be known as an intracellular symbiont.

They are further classified by their dependence on their host and can be a facultative symbiont that can exist in a free living condition and is not dependent on its host, or an obligate symbiont, which has adapted in such a way that it is not able to exit without the benefit it receives from its host. An example of an obligate symbioses is the relationship between microalgae and corals. The microalgae provides a large source of the coral diet

== Some symbiotic relationships ==
=== Coral reef symbiosis ===
The most notable display of marine symbiotic relationship would be coral. Coral reefs are home to a variety of dinoflagellate symbiont, these symbionts give coral its bright coloring and are vital for the survival of the reef. The symbionts provide the coral with food in exchange for protection. If the waters warm or become too acidic, the symbionts are expelled, the coral bleaches and if conditions persist the coral will die. This in turn leads to the collapse of the entire reef ecosystem

=== Bone eating worm symbiosis ===
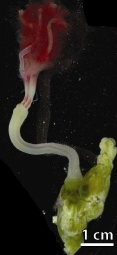
Figure 1 shows Osedax rubiplumus with ovisac (red colored projections) which houses symbiont bacteria

Osedax, also called the bone eating worm is a siboglinid worm from polychaete genus. It was discovered in a whalefall community on the surface of bones, in the axis of Monterey Canyon, California, in 2002. Osedax lacks a mouth, a functional gut and a trophosome. But female osedax have a vascularized root system originating from their ovisac which contains heterotrophic endosymbiotic bacterial community dominated by γ-proteobacteria clade. They use the vascularized root system to access the whale bones. The endosymbionts help the host utilize nutrients from the whale bones.

=== Hawaiian squid and Vibrio fischeri symbiosis ===
Hawaiian sepiolid squid Euprymna scolopes and bacterium Vibrio fischeri also show symbiosis. In this symbiosis, symbiont not only serve the host for defense, but also shapes the host morphology. Bioluminescent V. fischeri can be found in epithelial lined crypts of the light organ of the host. Symbiosis begins as soon as a newly hatched squid finds and houses V. fischeri bacteria.

Figure 2 shows sagittal section of bobtail squid Euprymna scolopes. light organ. The crypts house symbiont bacteria Vibrio fischeri. They emit light during night time to camouflage themselves against the moon and star light coming down the ocean. It helps them to avoid predators.

The symbiosis process begins when Peptidoglycan shed by the sea water bacteria comes in contact to the ciliated epithelial cells of the light organ. It induces mucus production in the cells. Mucus entraps bacterial cells. Antimicrobial peptides, nitric oxide and sialyted mucins in the mucus then selectively allow only V. fischeri which encode gene rscS to adhere and win over gram positive and other gram negative bacteria. The symbiotic bacteria are then guided up to the light organ via chemotaxis. After successful colonization, symbionts induce loss of mucus and ciliated sites to prevent further attachment of bacterial cells via MAMP (microbe associated molecular pattern) signalling. Also, they induce changes in protein expression in the host symbiotic tissues and modify both physiology and morphology of light organs. After bacterial cells divide and increase in population, they begin expressing enzyme luciferase as a result of quorum sensing. Luciferase enzymes produce bioluminescence. Squids can then emit the luminescence from the light organ. Because Euprymna scolopes emerges only during night time, it helps them avoid predation. Bioluminescence allows them to camouflage with the light coming from moon and stars to ocean and avoid predators.

=== Pompeii worm ===
Alvinella pompejana, the Pompeii worm is a polychaete, found in the far depths of the sea, typically found near hydrothermal vents. They were originally discovered by French researchers in the early 1980s. They can grow as large as 5 inches long and are normally described as having pale gray coloring with red "tentacle-like" gills protruding from their heads. Their tails are most likely found in temperatures as high as 176 degrees Fahrenheit, while their heads, which stick out from the tubes they live in are only exposed to temperatures as high as 72 degrees Fahrenheit. Its ability to survive the temperatures of hydrothermal vents lies in its symbiotic relationship with the bacteria that resides on its back. It forms a "fleece-like" protective covering. Mucus is secreted from glands on the back of the Pompeii worm in order to provide nutrients for the bacteria. Further study of the bacteria led to the discovery that they are chemolithotrophic.

=== Hawaiian sea slug ===
Elysia rufescens grazes on Bryopsis sp., an alga that defends itself from predators by using peptide toxins with fatty acids, called kahalalides. A bacterial obligate symbiont produces many defensive molecules, including kahalalides, in order to protect the alga. This bacteria is able to use substrates derived from the host in order to synthesize the toxins. The Hawaiian Sea Slug grazes on the alga in order to accumulate kahalalide. This uptake of the toxin, which the slug is immune to, allows it to also become toxic to predators. This shared ability, both originating from the bacteria, provide protection within the marine ecosystems.

=== Marine sponges ===
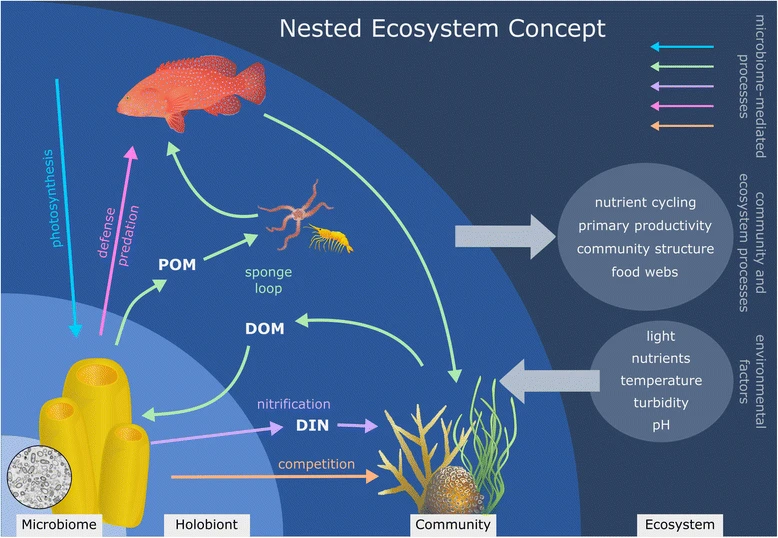
The sponge holobiont The sponge holobiont is an example of the concept of nested ecosystems. Key functions carried out by the microbiome (coloured arrows) influence holobiont functioning and, through cascading effects, subsequently influence community structure and ecosystem functioning. Environmental factors act at multiple scales to alter microbiome, holobiont, community, and ecosystem scale processes. Thus, factors that alter microbiome functioning can lead to changes at the holobiont, community, or even ecosystem level and vice versa, illustrating the necessity of considering multiple scales when evaluating functioning in nested ecosystems. DOM: dissolved organic matter; POM: particulate organic matter; DIN: dissolved inorganic nitrogen

Besides a one to one symbiotic relationship, it is possible for a host to become symbiotic with a microbial consortia. In the case of the sponge (phylum Porifera), they are able to host a lot of wide range of microbial communities that can also be very specific. The microbial communities that form a symbiotic relationship with the sponge can actually comprise up to 35% of the biomass of its host. The term for this specific symbiotic relationship, where a microbial consortia pairs with a host is called a holobiotic relationship. The sponge as well as the microbial community associated with it will produce a large range of secondary metabolites that help protect it against predators through mechanisms such as chemical defense. Some of these relationships include endosymbionts within bacteriocyte cells, and cyanobacteria or microalgae found below the pinacoderm cell layer where they are able to receive the highest amount of light, used for phototrophy. They can host approximately 52 different microbial phyla and candidate phyla, including Alphaproteobacteria, Actinobacteria, Chloroflexi, Nitrospirae, Cyanobacteria, the taxa Gamma-, and the candidate phylum Poribacteria, and Thaumarchaea.

=== Endozoicomonas ===
This type of bacteria was first described in 2007. It is able to form symbiotic relationships with a wide range of hosts in the marine environment such as cnidarians, poriferans, molluscs, annelids, tunicates, and fish. They are distributed through various marine zones from extreme depths to warm photic zones. Endozoicomonas is thought to acquisition nutrients from nitrogen/carbon recycling, methane/sulfur recycling, and synthesize amino acids and various other molecules necessary for life. It was also found that it has a correlation to photosymbionts which provide carbon and sulfur to the bacteria from dimethylsulfopropionate (DMSP). They are also suspected to help regulate bacterial colonization of the host by using bioactive secondary metabolites or even probiotic mechanisms like limiting pathogenic bacteria by means of competitive exclusion. When Endozoicomonas is removed from the host, there are often signs of lesions on corals and disease.

== Chemosynthetic symbioses in ocean ==
Marine environment consists of a large number of chemosynthetic symbioses in different regions of the ocean: shallow-water coastal sediments, continental slope sediments, whale and wood falls, cold seeps and deep-sea hydrothermal vents. Organisms from seven phyla (ciliophora, porifera, platyhelminthes, nematoda, mollusca, annelida and arthropoda) are known to have chemosynthetic symbiosis till now. Some of them include nematode, tube worms, clam, sponge, hydrothermal vent shrimp, worms mollusc, mussels and so on. The symbionts can be ectosymbionts or endosymbionts. Some ectosymbionts are: symbionts of polychaete worm Alvinella which occur in their dorsal surface and symbionts occurring on the mouthparts and gill chamber of the vent shrimp Rimicaris. Endosymbionts include symbionts of gastropod snails which occur in their gill tissues. In the siboglinid tube worms of the groups Monilifera, Frenulata and Vestimentifera, symbionts can be found in an interior organ called trophosome.

Most of the animals in deep-sea hydrothermal vents exist in a symbiotic relationship with chemosynthetic bacteria. These chemosynthetic bacteria are found to be methane or sulphur oxidizers.

== Microbial biotechnology ==
Marine invertebrates are the hosts of a wide spectrum of bioactive metabolites, which have vast potential as drugs and research tools. In many cases, microbes aid in or are responsible for marine invertebrates natural products. Certain marine microbes can provide insight into the biosynthesis mechanisms of natural products, which in turn could solve the current limitations on marine drug development.
