= Colleen Cavanaugh =

American microbiologist

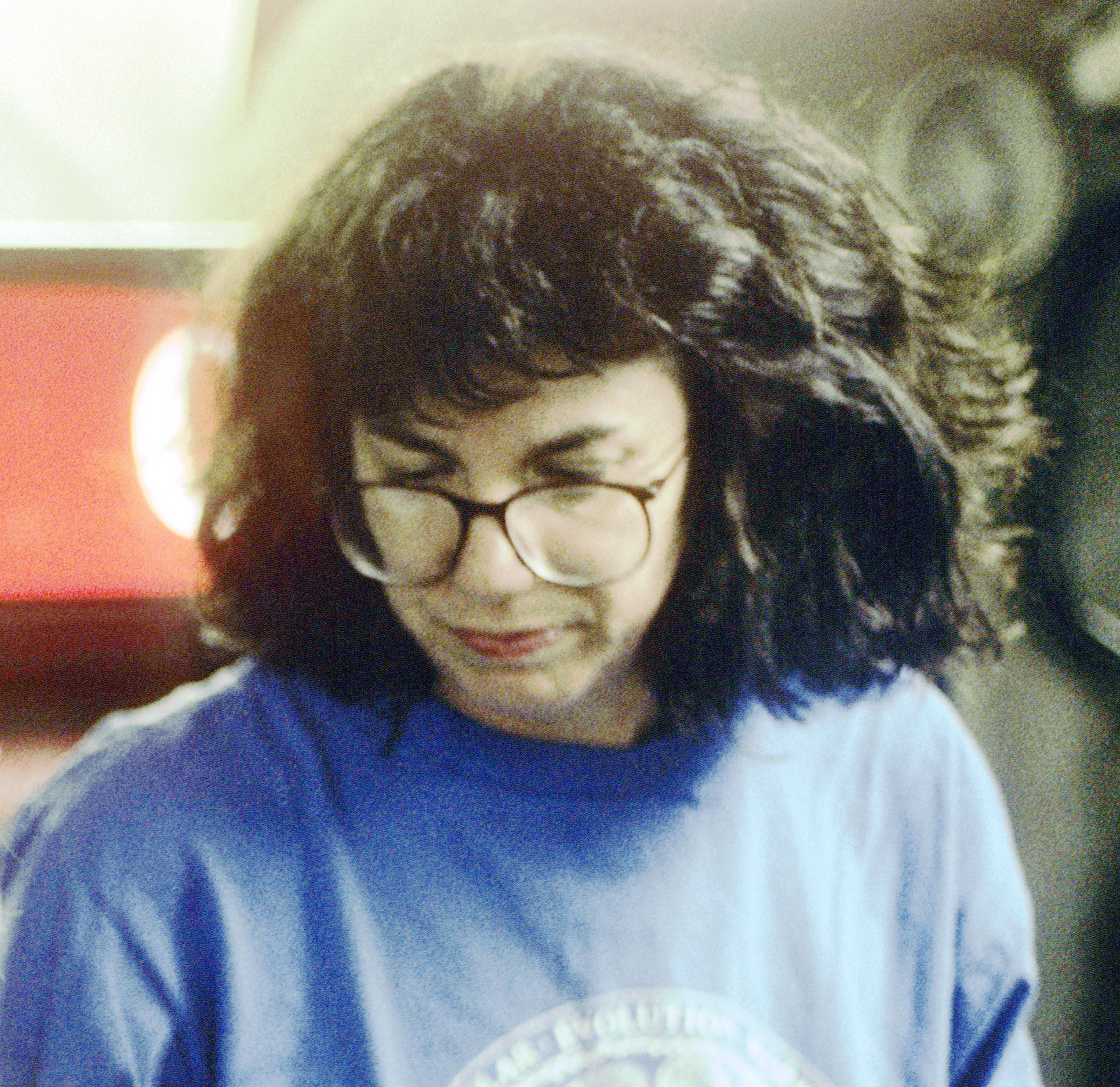
- Colleen Cavanaugh in 1992
- Born: 1953 (age 72–73); Detroit
- Education: Harvard University
- Occupation: microbiologist
- Known for: studies of hydrothermal vent ecosystems
- Scientific career
- Thesis: Symbiosis of chemoautotrophic bacteria and marine invertebrates (1985)

Colleen Marie Cavanaugh is an American academic microbiologist best known for her studies of hydrothermal vent ecosystems. As of 2002, she is the Edward C. Jeffrey Professor of Biology in the Department of Organismic and Evolutionary Biology at Harvard University and is affiliated with the Marine Biological Laboratory and the Woods Hole Oceanographic Institution. Cavanaugh was the first to propose that the deep-sea giant tube worm, Riftia pachyptila, obtains its food from bacteria living within its cells, an insight which she had as a graduate student at Harvard. Significantly, she made the connection that these chemoautotrophic bacteria were able to play this role through their use of chemosynthesis, the biological oxidation of inorganic compounds (e.g., hydrogen sulfide) to synthesize organic matter from very simple carbon-containing molecules, thus allowing organisms such as the bacteria (and dependent organisms such as tube worms) to exist in deep ocean without sunlight.

== Early life and education ==
Cavanaugh was born in Detroit, Michigan, in 1953.

Cavanaugh received her undergraduate degree from the University of Michigan in 1977, where she initially studied music but ultimately majored in ecology. She says her life changed direction in her sophomore year when she heard about a course in marine ecology at the oceanographic center in Woods Hole, Massachusetts. There, her work involved wading out into chilly waters to study the mating habits of horseshoe crabs, and she described herself as "[falling] in love" with the relaxed camaraderie and exchange of ideas between biologists, geologists, and scientists from other disciplines. Cavanaugh took a Marine Ecology course as an undergraduate offered by the University of Michigan, stayed in Woods Hole afterwards (as her car needed repair) looking for a job, and ultimately replaced a "no show" in a Boston University undergraduate research program, which returned her to work with local horseshoe crabs.

Cavanaugh then moved to Cape Cod to work at the Marine Biological Laboratory at Woods Hole. During the next two years the focus of her attention shifted from Crustacea to bacteria, "creatures that impressed her for their ability to live anywhere."

== Graduate training ==
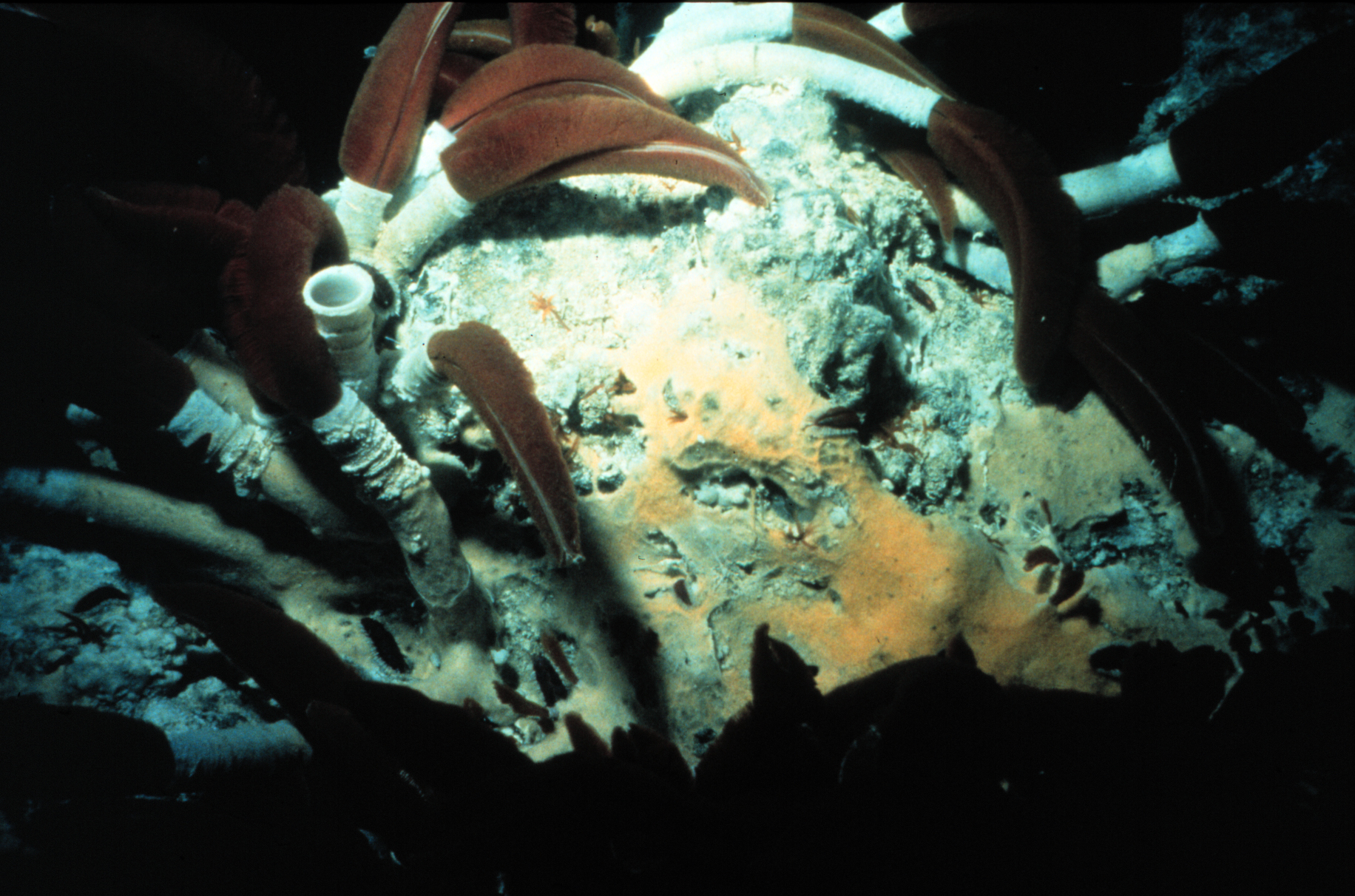
Cavanaugh's analyses of bacterial symbioses involving giant tube worms and other deep sea invertebrateshas led to her being described as a "scientific Captain Nemo."

Cavanaugh pursued her graduate training in biology at Harvard University, in association with the Museum of Comparative Zoology. She entered Harvard in the fall of 1979, earning an M.A. in 1981 and graduating with her PhD in biology in 1985. Her Ph.D. dissertation, entitled Symbiosis of chemoautotrophic bacteria and marine invertebrates, was accepted in 1985.

=== Discovery of chemosynthesis in tube worms ===
By one account, Cavanaugh was attending a lecture by Meredith L. Jones, curator of worms at the Smithsonian Institution, shortly after she began her graduate studies. Jones was discussing the giant tube worm, a creature lacking both mouth and gut, where the challenge was to understand how it survived. Jones mentioned elemental sulfur crystals within the worms gut; Cavanaugh states that "It was at that point that I jumped up and said, 'Well, it's perfectly clear! They must have sulphur-oxidising bacteria inside their bodies'". Jones apparently told her to sit down, but provided Cavanaugh with a specimen captured by a research submarine working on the bottom of the Pacific Ocean. Cavanaugh eventually substantiated her case.

The Harvard Gazette describes Cavanaugh's pioneering study of these unique creatures:

As a first-year graduate student, she discovered what makes life possible... where the sun never shines, [where] temperatures can exceed 250 degrees F, and [where] the ocean exerts pressures of thousands of pounds on every square inch of an animal's body. Giant worms, huge clams and mussels, and strange shrimp thrive in such conditions because of one-celled bacteria who live on and inside them. The bacteria turn sulfur, methane, and other inedibles into organic molecules that their hosts feed on.

Cavanaugh went on to publish the results of the further work that began to substantiate the discovery, writing from the Museum of Comparative Zoology at Harvard, as first of a five author paper, a short 1981 Science report with Stephen L. Gardiner and Meredith L. Jones of the Smithsonian Institution, and Holgar W. Jannasch and John B. Waterbury at Woods Hole (see Significant publications).

== Career ==
Cavanaugh's first appointment was as a Junior Fellowship in the Society of Fellows at Harvard University, in 1986–1989. This was followed by elevation to assistant professorship in 1989, and associate professor in 1993. In 1995, she was granted tenure as a full professor "for [her] discoveries and her reputation as a teacher and mentor." Cavanaugh was the Co-director of the Harvard Microbial Sciences Initiative for 17 years.

== Research and outreach highlights ==
Cavanaugh has continued to build her career on the study of hydrothermal vent ecology. Cavanaugh went on to discover similar symbiotic partnerships among Solemyidae clams living in shallow eelgrass beds and mudflats along the New England coast, and in shrimp near sub-sea springs in the middle of the Atlantic.

Cavanaugh believes that life on Earth may have started under similar conditions and says "the idea makes sense because some of the oldest forms of free-living bacteria show signs of being heat-loving organisms." Cavanaugh's work has made the scientific community rethink the "warm chicken soup" theory of life's origins in which the accumulation of organic molecules in shallow waters was a result of lightning electricity.

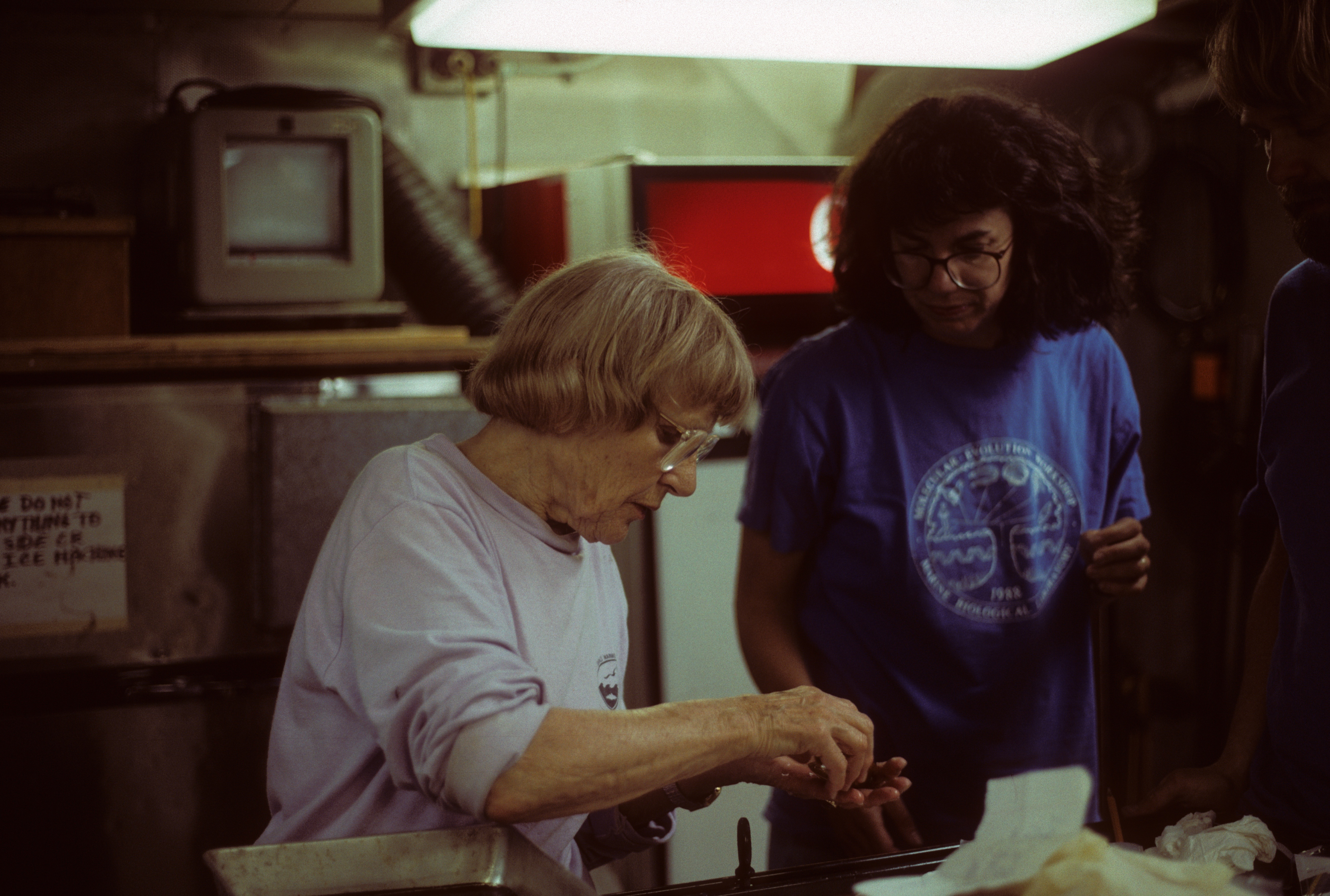
Ruth Turner and Cavanaugh dissecting Alvin-retrieved clams from the deep sea in 1992

Cavanaugh's discoveries of the biology of the deep Pacific Ocean were made in a Cambridge, Massachusetts (Harvard) laboratory, and she worked on marine life in the laboratory and on board ships for twelve years before securing a place on the deep-diving submarine Alvin; she went to the bottom of the Gulf of Mexico, off the Florida coast, for the first time in 1992. According to the Harvard Gazette article:

Not many people have visited with 6-foot-long, bright red worms on the boiling bottom of the ocean. It sounds like a Jules Verne fantasy, but newly tenured Professor of Biology Colleen Cavanaugh has seen these and other strange creatures on voyages to the bottom of the deep sea.

She later participated in more "Extreme Expeditions"—such as a dive to a depth of 8,200 feet off the west coast of Mexico to collect tube worms and their bacteria, the chemically-rich fluids that flow out of the vents, and mineral samples from the deep sea ocean floor. Cavanaugh, who has been called "a scientific Captain Nemo." is prominent in her field of biology. Robert Kunzig, in describing her work for a 2001 Discover magazine article, writes of her visit to "a hot crack in the Earth under the Indian Ocean":

Biologists who study the physiology of organisms are under time pressure: They must dissect the organisms before they deteriorate. Colleen Cavanaugh, a microbiologist from Harvard, needs animals that are alive and not starved; once they've been away from their vent too long, even if they've been sitting in a box on the ocean floor, they start to digest the symbiotic bacteria in which she is interested.

As reported in February 2000, Cavanaugh is the discoverer of a new species of deep-dwelling mussel in the Gulf of Mexico that shares its body with symbiotic bacteria that feed on methane. She joined Craig Smith of the University of Hawaii and other colleagues in a Nature report on a NOAA National Undersea Research Program study at its West Coast and Polar Regions Center (at the University of Alaska, Fairbanks), regarding how whale corpses that drop to the bottom of the ocean—and their bones in particular—play an important role in ocean floor ecology.

As of the late 2010's, Cavanaugh's research has shifted focus towards studying microbiomes, particularly the human oral microbiome and the gut microbiome of Darwin's finches.

== Cavanaugh Laboratory ==
The Cavanaugh Laboratory at Harvard works on a number of projects related to bacterial symbiosis in marine invertebrates from deep sea hydrothermal vents, methane seeps, and coastal reducing sediments. Researchers there have a special interest in characterizing the metabolic and genetic capabilities of symbionts, their evolutionary relationships with free-living bacteria, and the co-evolution of symbiont and host.

== Awards ==
- Fellow of the American Association for the Advancement of Science (1996)

== Significant publications ==
- Cavanaugh, CM; Abbott, MS; Veenhuis, M (1988). "Immunochemical Localization of Ribulose-1,5-bisphosphate Carboxylase in the Symbiont-Containing Gills of Solemya velum (Bivalvia: Mollusca)" (PDF). Proceedings of the National Academy of Sciences of the United States of America. 85 (20): 7786–7789. Bibcode:1988PNAS...85.7786C. doi:10.1073/pnas.85.20.7786. JSTOR 33030. PMC 282278. PMID 16593987.
- Cavanaugh, CM; Gardiner, SL; Jones, ML; Jannasch, HW; Waterbury, JB (1981). "Prokaryotic Cells in the Hydrothermal Vent Tube Worm Riftia pachyptila Jones: Possible Chemoautotrophic Symbionts". Science. 213 (4505): 340–342. Bibcode:1981Sci...213..340C. doi:10.1126/science.213.4505.340. PMID 17819907.
