= Heptabrachia =

Scientific classification
- Kingdom: Animalia
- Phylum: Annelida
- Clade: Pleistoannelida
- Clade: Sedentaria
- Order: Sabellida
- Family: Siboglinidae
- Genus: Heptabrachia; Ivanov, 1952

Genus of tube worms

Heptabrachia is a genus of tube worms in the family Siboglinidae.

== Species ==
- Heptabrachia abyssicola Ivanov, 1952
- Heptabrachia beringensis Ivanov, 1960
- Heptabrachia ctenophora Ivanov, 1962
- Heptabrachia gracilis Ivanov, 1957
- Heptabrachia subtilis Ivanov, 1957
- Heptabrachia talboti Southward, 1961
