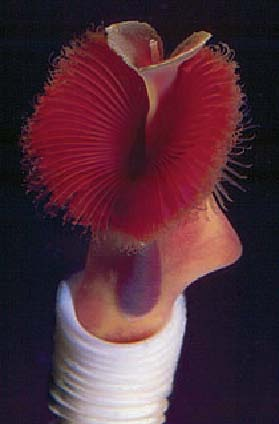
- Tevnia jerichonana

Scientific classification
- Kingdom: Animalia
- Phylum: Annelida
- Clade: Pleistoannelida
- Clade: Sedentaria
- Order: Sabellida
- Family: Siboglinidae
- Genus: Tevnia; Jones, 1985
- Species: T. jerichonana

Binomial name
- Tevnia jerichonana Jones, 1985

= Tevnia =

Genus of annelid worms

Tevnia is a genus of giant tube worm in the family Siboglinidae, with only one species, Tevnia jerichonana, living in a unique deep-sea environment. These deep sea marine species survive in environments like hydrothermal vents. These vents give off gas and toxic chemicals with the addition of having superheated temperatures. The giant tube worm prefers environments such as these despite the harsh temperature and toxic sea water.

== Description ==
The giant tube worm lives inside a long narrow tube made from a chitin, that is the hard material of its outer skeleton, and it attaches to the ocean floor. It possesses a retractable plume that is extended when the worm is not disturbed. Its size can go up to 2 metres (6.6 ft) tall. The plume is a complex structure that has tightly stacked sheets of tentacles forming a gill-like organ. This is used to take up nutrients from the surrounding waters. The plume also has blood vessels containing large amounts of haemoglobin, which gives the animal a blood-red colouration. The larvae are mobile and can move from different vents.

== Environment ==
The deep-sea worm Tenvia jerichoana is closely related to the deep-sea worm Riftia pachyptila. They both rely exclusively on a single species of sulfide-oxidizing endosymbiotic bacteria for their nutrients. However, they do thrive in different geochemical conditions. Hydrothermal vents arise when Earth's tectonic plates spread apart, where magma interacts with sea water to create an environment for certain types of microbes. T. jerichoana is spread eastern Pacific Ocean, particularly in the East Pacific Rise. They live in water depths between 1,800 and 3,050 metres (5,910 and 10,010 ft), as well as water temperatures of 1.82 to 2.89 degrees Celsius.
