= Escarpia laminata =

Scientific classification
- Domain: Eukaryota
- Kingdom: Animalia
- Phylum: Annelida
- Clade: Pleistoannelida
- Clade: Sedentaria
- Order: Sabellida
- Family: Siboglinidae
- Genus: Escarpia
- Species: E. laminata

Binomial name
- Escarpia laminata Jones, 1985

Species of annelid

Escarpia laminata is one of the longest living tube worms that can be found in the cold seeps at a depth of 1000m to 3000m from sea level in the Gulf of Mexico. These organisms often reach age of between 100–200 years, with some of them determined to be more than 300 years old. It is possible that some may be aged 1,000 years or more. The species was first classified in 1985.
