= Oligobrachia =

Scientific classification
- Kingdom: Animalia
- Phylum: Annelida
- Clade: Pleistoannelida
- Clade: Sedentaria
- Order: Sabellida
- Family: Siboglinidae
- Genus: Oligobrachia; Ivanov, 1957

Genus of polychaete annelid worms

Oligobrachia is a genus in the family Siboglinidae, commonly known as beard worms. These beard worms are typically found at spreading centers, hydrothermal vents, and undersea volcanoes. The Siboglinidae are annelids that can often be found buried in sediments.

Beard worms do not inhabit one specific part of the world's oceans but are distributed across ocean floors as long as the surrounding environmental conditions are suitable; these populations are referred to as metapopulations. Most commonly, these organisms are found on the ocean floor, at depths ranging from approximately 25 meters to several hundred meters.

Oligobrachia is typically associated with hydrothermal vents and methane seeps. A notable characteristic of this genus is the absence of a mouth and gut. Instead, these worms rely on symbiotic bacteria to provide them with energy necessary for survival.

The majority of Oligobrachia specimens observed have been found in the Arctic and other high-latitude regions of the world's oceans.

== Endosymbiotic bacteria ==
Oligobrachia, like all genera within the Siboglinidae family, lack a mouth and gut. To compensate, this family has evolved a symbiotic relationship with bacteria. These symbionts provide up to half of the DNA required by their tubeworm hosts.

Unlike vertical transmission, where DNA is passed directly from parent to offspring, these symbionts are shared among individuals within a generation through a process known as horizontal transmission. This method of symbiont acquisition can be an evolutionary costly trait, as changing environmental conditions may impact the availability or functionality of these symbiotic bacteria.

Even hydrothermal vents, which are hypothesized to be among the most stable environments on Earth, can undergo changes that alter the proportion of chemicals in the area. in the area. The genus Oligobrachia has evolved specialized cells that provide a habitat for the endosymbiotic bacteria on which the tube worm relies for survival.

Depending on the habitat where Oligobrachia resides—whether near a hydrothermal vent or an undersea volcano—the endosymbiotic bacteria oxidize methane, sulfide, or other dominant chemicals present in the water.

Studies have shown that Oligobrachia can select specific types of endosymbiotic bacteria that best suit their environmental conditions. These bacteria can be either thioautotrophic (utilizing sulfide as an energy source) or methanotrophic (utilizing methane as an energy source).

Oligobrachia residing near undersea volcanoes are more likely to select thioautotrophic endosymbiotic bacteria, while those living near hydrothermal vents are more likely to select methanotrophic bacteria.

== Hemoglobin production ==
Some studies have explored hemoglobin production in beard worms. These studies have determined that the site of hemoglobin production is located in the peritoneal membrane of the posterior body. Although research on this process in tubeworms is limited, the findings consistently point to the peritoneal membrane as the site of hemoglobin synthesis.

== Internal anatomy ==
Among known deep sea organisms, tubeworms are some of the most extensively studied. Research on their nervous system has primarily focused on the central nervous system rather than the peripheral nervous system.

Studies have identified three main features of tubeworm sensory systems: epidermal solitary sensory cells, sensory spots, and structures presumed to be sensory organs. The lack of diversity observed in the nervous systems of the studied tubeworms may provide insights into the evolutionary origin of the genus Oligobrachia.

== Development ==
Siboglinidae is one of the most extensively studied families of deep sea marine organisms. During the development of tubeworms, they form a structure known as the trophophore, a specialized part of the body that hosts their endosymbiotic bacteria.

It has been hypothesized that the trophophore develops in response to the needs of these bacteria, which rely on this feature of the tubeworm's internal anatomy to perform metabolic processes that Siboglinidae cannot carry out on their own. As previously mentioned, Siboglinidae lack a mouth and gut, so the endosymbiotic bacteria perform these essential processes in exchange for a protected habitat.

Studies on the development of Oligobrachia have also observed this species incubating embryos.
