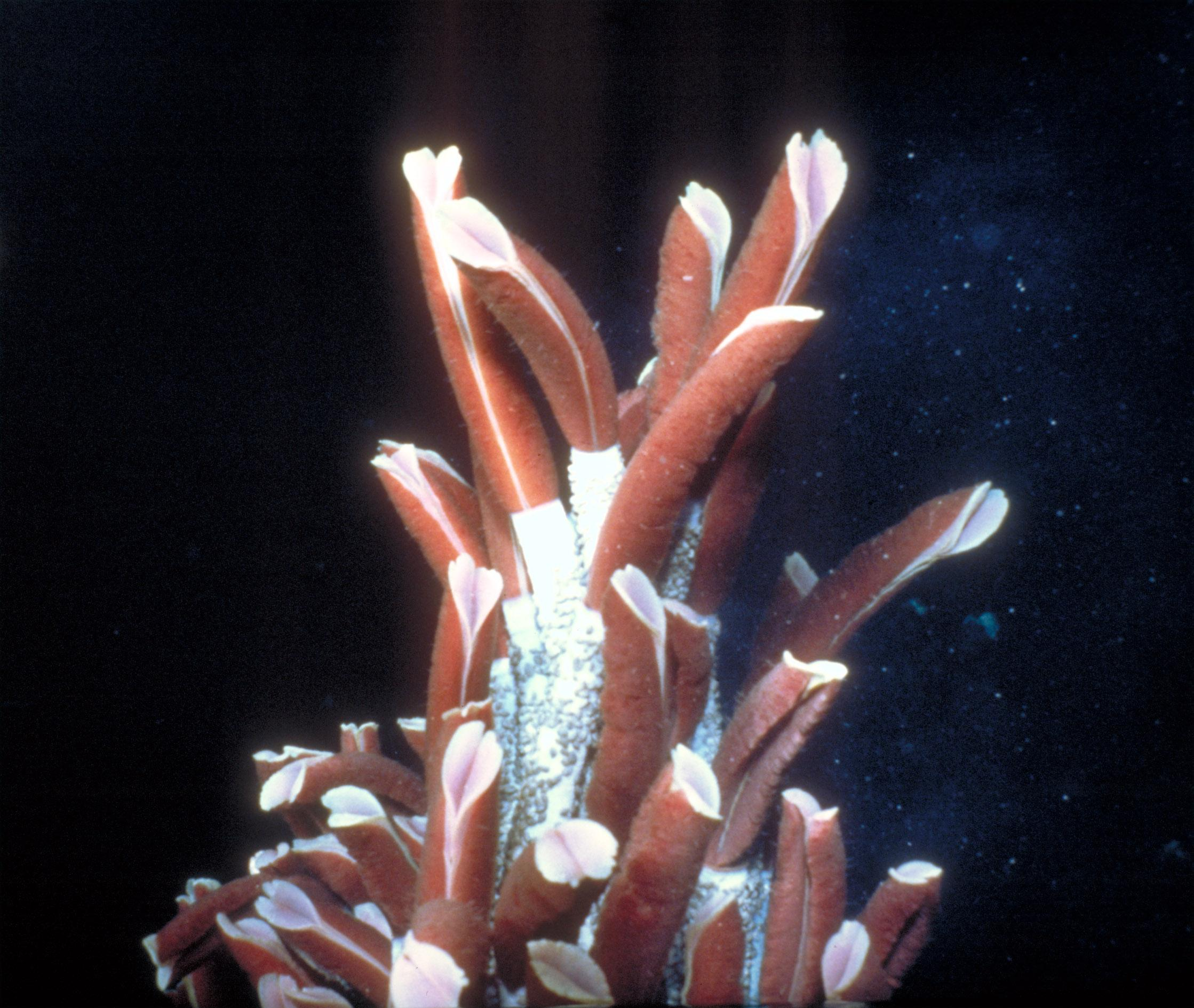

Scientific classification
- Kingdom: Animalia
- Phylum: Annelida
- Clade: Pleistoannelida
- Clade: Sedentaria
- Order: Sabellida
- Family: Siboglinidae
- Genus: Riftia; M. L. Jones, 1981
- Species: R. pachyptila

Binomial name
- Riftia pachyptila M. L. Jones, 1981

= Riftia =

Giant tubeworm

Giant tube worm (species of annelid)

Riftia is a monotypic genus of polychaete annelid worms in the Siboglinidae family, which contains the sole species Riftia pachyptila, commonly known as the giant tubeworm or giant beardworm.

R. pachyptila is found in association with geologically active regions of the deep sea. Riftia worms are sessile and are found clustered together in large colonies around deep-sea hydrothermal vents in the East Pacific Rise and the Galapagos Rift. The size of a patch of tube worms surrounding a vent can span tens of metres, and individuals can reach a length of 3 m (9 ft 10 in). R. pachyptila has the fastest growth rate of any known marine invertebrate, and have been known to colonize a new site, grow to sexual maturity, and increase in length to 4.9 ft (1.5 m) in less than two years.

Adult Riftia worms lack a digestive system and rely on their symbiotic relationship with chemotrophic sulfur-oxidising bacteria to provide them with energy. The hydrothermal vent habitat in which Riftia lives provides a natural ambient temperature ranging from 2–30 degrees Celsius (36–86 °F) and emits large amounts of chemicals such as hydrogen sulfide that are utilised by the tube worm for bacterial chemosynthesis.

== Taxonomy ==
R. pachyptila was first encountered in 1977 during an expedition to the hydrothermal vents on the floor of the Galápagos Rift. It is the only species in the genus Riftia. The generic name alludes to the rift that formed the geothermal vents where the species inhabits, while pachyptila (pachy; thick + ptilon; feather) refers to the anterior plume of the worm. The holotype, USNM 59951, is held by the National Museum of Natural History (USNM).

Historically, the genus Riftia was placed within the obsolete phyla Pogonophora. They are now understood to be annelids, and have been placed in the family Siboglinidae, with their closest relatives being other deep sea tube worms such as Escarpia and Lamellibrachia.

== Description ==
=== Anatomy ===
Like other siboglinade tube worms, R. pachyptila has a wormlike body that secretes a chitinous tube for protection and support. Riftia worms can reach a length of 3 m (9 ft 10 in), and their bodies have a diameter of 4 cm (1.6 in).

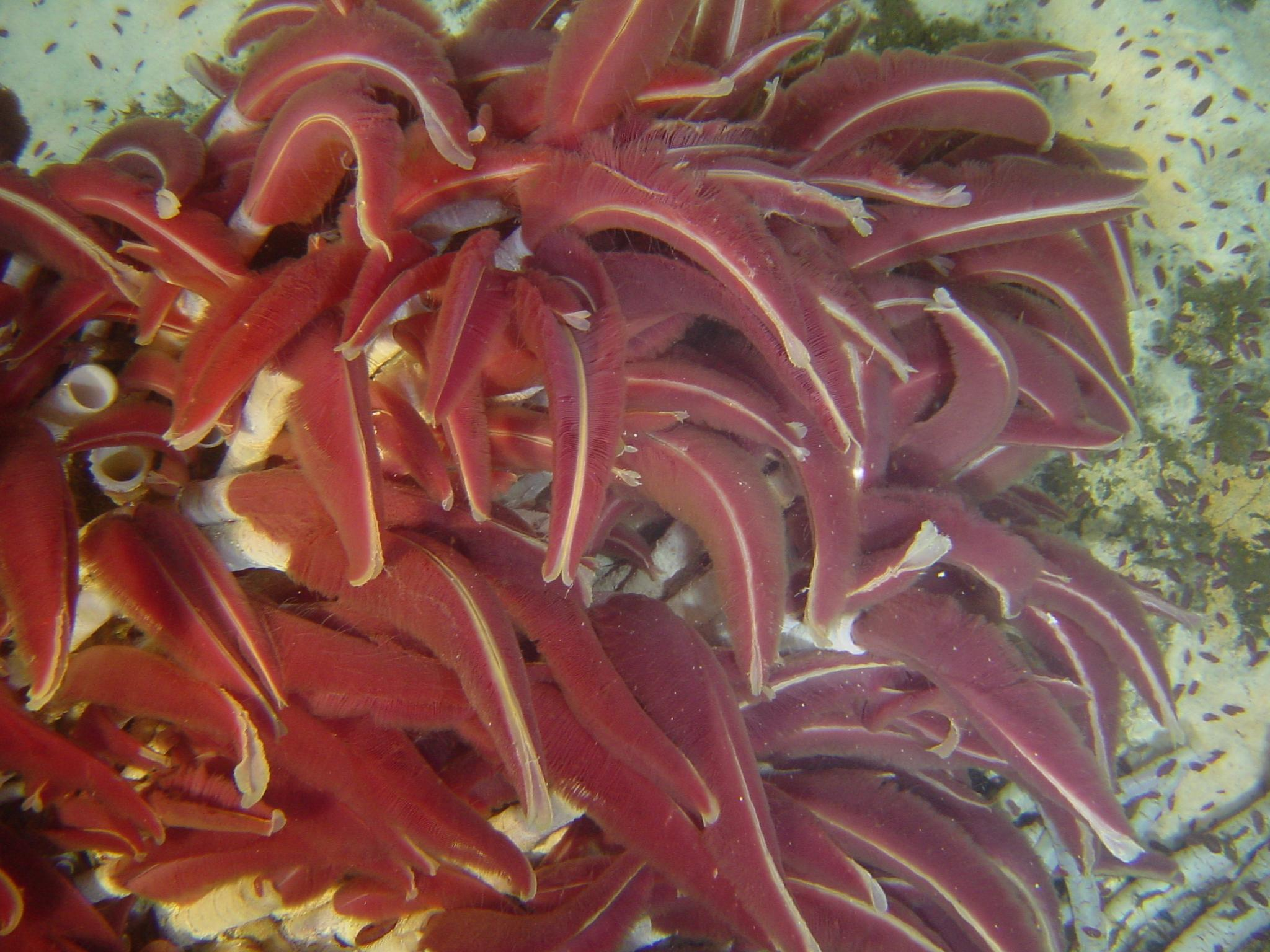
The red branchial plumes are supported by the white obturaculum, which also seals the tube when the worm retracts itself.

Riftia have a red feather-like structure called a branchial plume at the anterior end which is used to acquire chemicals for chemosynthesis. The plume is highly vascularised, and its red colour is due to the presence of hemoglobin. The structure of the plume maximises the surface area needed to absorb chemicals from the water efficiently.

The red respiratory lamellae of the plume grow out of the obturaculum, a rigid, collagenous support structure that splits and flares out at the tip. If the tubeworm perceives a threat or is touched, it retracts the plume into its tube and seals the tube with the tip of the obturaculum, which functions as a kind of an operculum.

Beneath the plume is the vestimentum, a muscular body region that contains the heart, the brain and the two genital openings.

The middle region of the body houses the coelomic cavity, gonads, and the trophosome, a spongy tissue where symbiotic bacteria and sulfur granules are found. Adult Riftia do not eat and have no mouth, digestive system or anus. Instead, they rely on bacteria in their trophosome to provide them with nutrition.

The posterior part of the worm is the opisthosome, which anchors the animal to its tube and is used to store waste from bacterial reactions.

==== Tubes ====
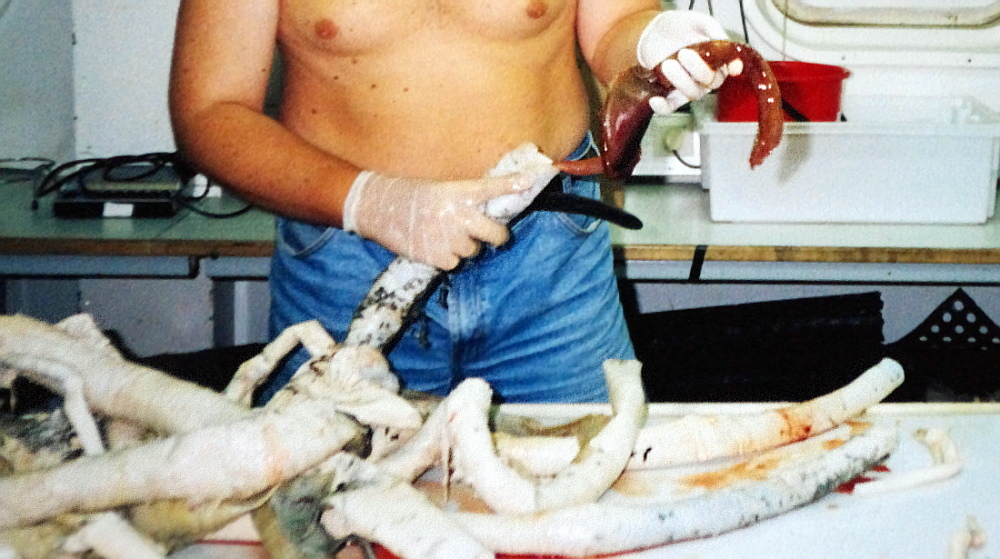
Riftia pachyptila being extracted out of its tube

Riftia's tubes are composed of chitin, secreted from cup-microvilli-like structures within glands which form crystallite chitin layers over time. The tube is cylindrical, flexible, and closed at the posterior end. Riftia tubes can reach 2 m in length and 5 cm in diameter and are very thick compared to those of other tubeworms, especially at the base. The tubes are very resistant to enzymatic attack by bacteria, and can take years to decompose. The worms are able to adjust both the top and the base of their tubes, which allows for some adaptability in the highly competitive and crowded spaces they grow in, as a worm may need to adjust its position to maximise its access to vent fluid as more worms settle in the colony. Riftia tubes grow at a rate of 10 to 85 cm (3.9 to 33.5 in) per year.

== Physiology ==
=== Metabolism ===
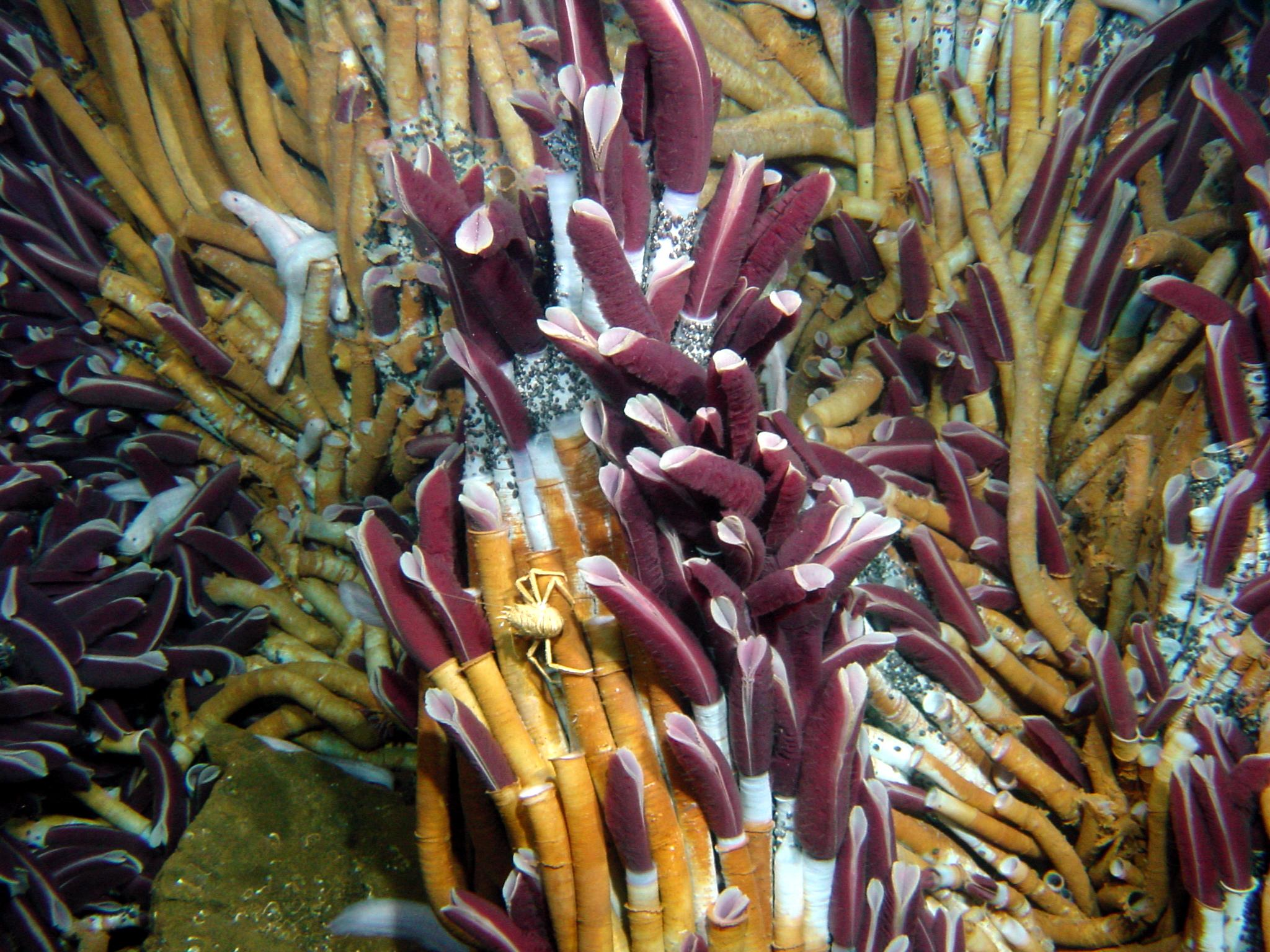
Riftia on the Eastern Pacific Ridge, 2,630 m (8,630 ft) depth

Deep-sea species which do not inhabit hydrothermal vent sites typically have low metabolic rates. In contrast, the enzyme activity relating to glycolysis, the citric acid cycle and electron transport in R. pachyptila is similar to that of shallow-living animals, suggesting a significantly faster metabolism than is typical of deep sea animals. Despite their toxicity, nitrate and nitrites are required for Riftia's biosynthetic processes: the chemosynthetic bacteria within the trophosome convert nitrate to ammonium ions, which are then converted to amino acids utilized by the tubeworms. To transport nitrate to the bacteria, R. pachyptila concentrates nitrate in its blood to a concentration 100 times higher than the surrounding seawater; the exact mechanism used to withstand and concentrate nitrate to this degree is still unknown.

Hydrothermal vents create low-oxygen conditions (hypoxia). In hypoxic conditions, sulfur-storing organisms start producing hydrogen sulfide (H_{2}S). In R. pachyptila, the production of H_{2}S starts after 24 hours of hypoxia. H_{2}S can be damaging for some physiological processes as it inhibits the activity of cytochrome c oxidase, impairing oxidative phosphorylation. Riftia pachyptila are able to bind H_{2}S to haemoglobin in its blood to expel it in the surrounding environment, in order to avoid physiological damage. Additionally, Riftia hemoglobins are atypical in that they are able to carry oxygen in the presence of sulfide without being inhibited by it.

=== Relationship with endosymbiotic bacteria ===
In its adult phase, R. pachyptila lacks a digestive system and cannot eat. Instead, Riftia gains nutrients from the environment by utilising a process known as chemoautotrophic symbiosis. In this process, hemoglobins in the branchial plume bind to O_{2} and H_{2}S which are then transported through capillaries in the plume to the trophosome, where they can be absorbed by endosymbiotic bacteria. These bacteria live inside specialised cells (bacteriocytes) and have no contact with the external environment, relying entirely on the tube worm to provide them with nutrients as well as for the removal of their waste products.

The sulfur-oxidizing bacteria within the trophosome, which runs almost the whole length of the tube worm's body cavity, are able to convert common chemicals in the hydrothermal vent environment into the carbohydrates that sustain them and the tube worm. These hydrothermal chemicals typically include carbon, nitrogen, oxygen, and sulfur, which are transported by the tube worm into its trophosome to provide the bacteria with nutrition. Riftia acquires nutrients from the bacteria by digesting them once they reach a certain size.

== Life history ==
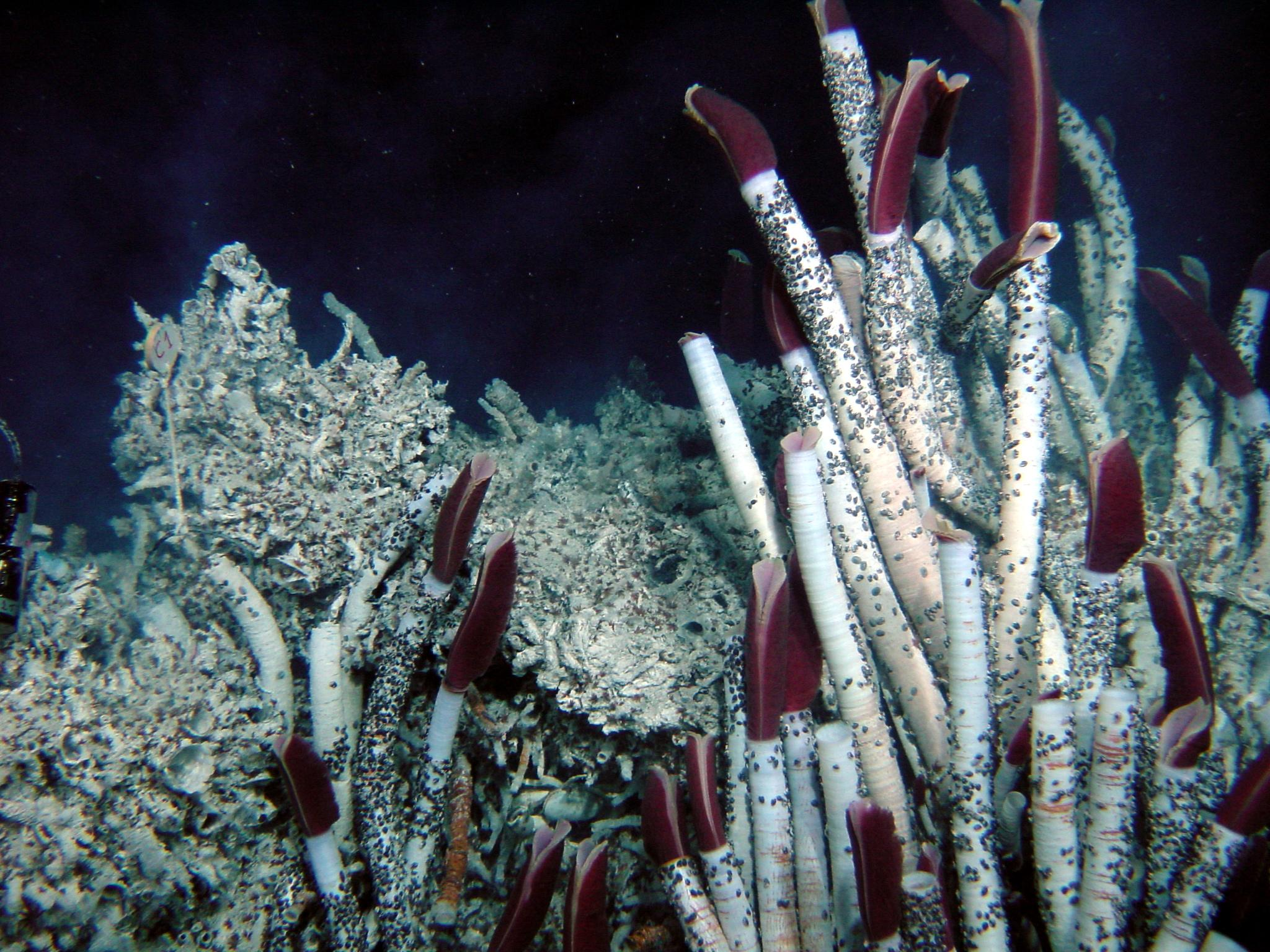
Riftia tubes covered in epibionts

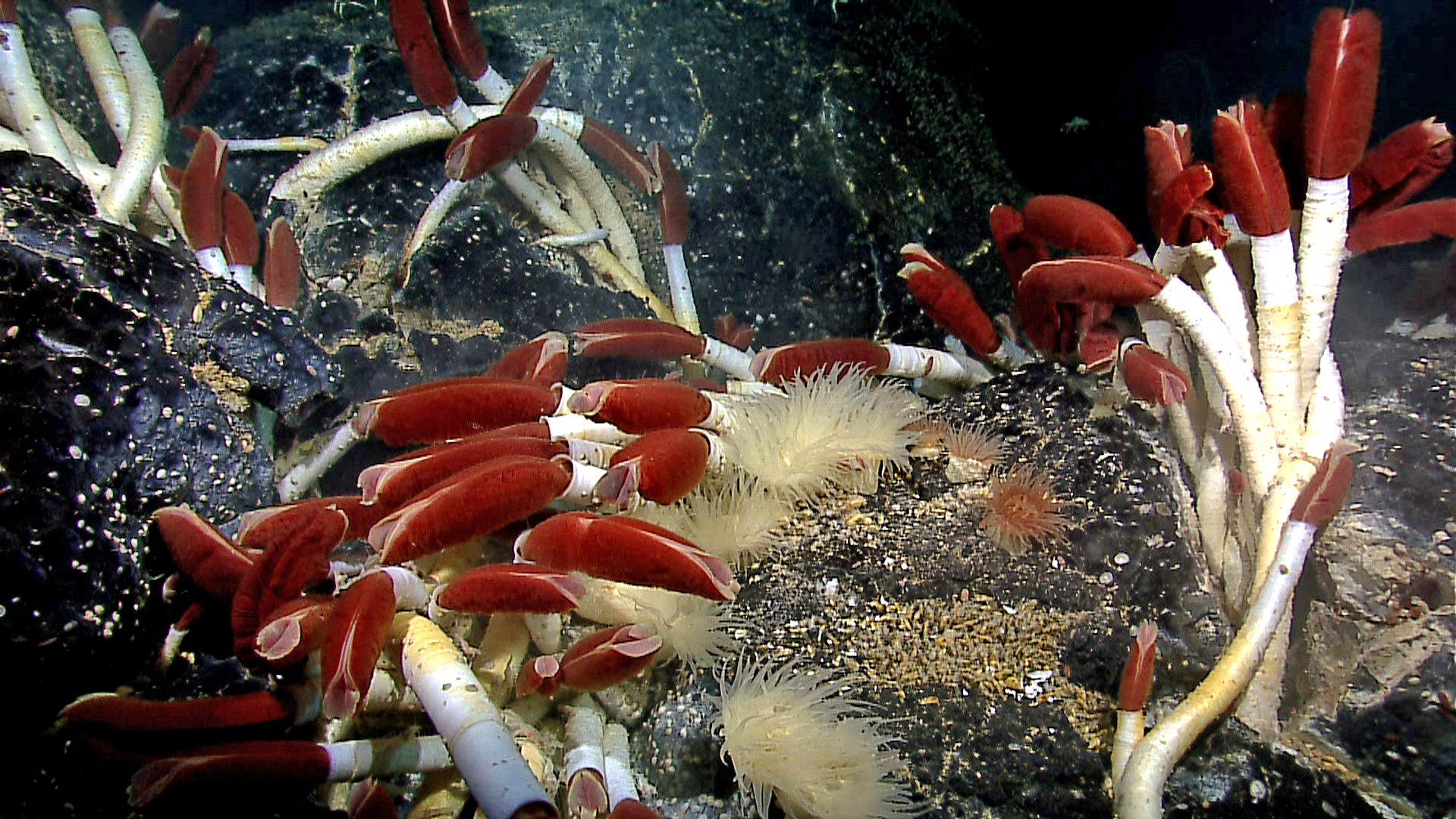
Alongside mussels and sea anemones

=== Ecology ===
Riftia worms do not colonize all hydrothermal vents, preferring vent sites that produce considerable amounts of sulfide and temperatures up to 54 °C.

Riftia is able to coexist with other large sessile animals through niche partitioning. Riftia requires areas of high water flow, temperature, and sulfide concentrations, in contrast to Calyptogena magnifica's need of low flow and temperature, and Bathymodiolus thermophilus' flexibility; B. thermophilus mussels may grow in places ranging from the periphery of the vent field, to directly on Riftia's tubes.

It is suggested that the smaller-bodied tubeworm Tevnia may facilitate later vent colonization by Riftia.

=== Reproduction ===
R. pachyptila is dioecious. The male's spermatozoa are thread-shaped and are about 130 μm long overall. The sperm is arranged into an agglomeration of around 340–350 individual spermatozoa that form a torch-like shape, referred to as spermatozeugmata.

The ovaries of females run within the gonocoel along the entire length of the trunk, ventral to the trophosome. Eggs at different maturation stages can be found in the middle area of the ovaries, and depending on their developmental stage, are referred to as: oogonia, oocytes, and follicular cells. When the oocytes mature, they acquire protein and lipid yolk granules.

Males release their sperm into seawater. Usually, the spermatozeugmata swim into the female's tube. Movement of the cluster is conferred by the collective action of each spermatozoon moving independently.

=== Larval stage ===
R. pachyptila develops from a free-swimming, pelagic, non-symbiotic trochophore larva, which enters juvenile (metatrochophore) development, becoming sessile, and subsequently acquiring symbiotic bacteria. R. pachyptila larvae are planktonic and move through sea-bottom currents until they reach active hydrothermal vent sites. Once the larvae find a site and settle, they are tethered to it for life and will die if the site ceases to be volcanically active.

The digestive tract is present in the larval stage and consists of a mouth foregut, midgut, hindgut, and anus. After symbionts are established in the midgut, they undergo substantial remodeling and enlargement to become the trophosome, while the remainder of the digestive tract has not been detected in adult specimens.

R. pachyptila is dependent on volcanic gases and the presence of sulfide-oxidizing bacteria. It acquires these from hydrothermal vent sites that are patchy and ephemeral. The distance between active sites along a rift can be hundreds of km. R. pachytpila is capable of larval dispersal across distances of 100 to 200 km and cultured larvae have been shown to be viable for 38 days. Though dispersal is considered to be effective, the genetic variability observed in R. pachyptila metapopulation is low compared to other vent species. This may be due to high extinction events and colonization events, as R. pachyptila is one of the first species to colonize a new active site.

=== Lifespan ===
Some sources list Riftia pachyptila as one of the world's longest living organisms, but the unstable vent environment and high ecological turnover makes this claim unlikely, with most vents typically lasting for less than 10 years. Some related deep-sea tube worms that inhabit more stable cold seep environments such as Lamellibrachia and Escarpia have better claims to longevity, with age measurements of both species exceeding a century.

== Hydrogen sulfide chemosynthesis ==
=== Background ===
Sunlight is necessary for the process of photosynthesis.

Most ecosystems on earth rely on photosynthetic organisms, such as plants, to form the base of their food web. Photosynthetic organisms use light energy from sunlight to convert carbon dioxide and water into carbohydrates and oxygen. The carbohydrates produced provide energy to the organisms, as well as to other organisms higher up in the food chain that consume them.

A chart depicting Riftia chemosynthesis 1: Hydrothermal Vents 2: Hydrogen Sulfide 3: Oxygen 4: Sulfur-oxidising bacteria 5: Riftia 6: Energy 7: Carbohydrates

However, in deep sea environments no sunlight is able to reach the sea floor, and photosynthesis becomes impossible. Hydrothermal vent ecosystems are instead based on chemosynthetic microbes such as sulfur-oxidising bacteria. These microbes are able to generate carbohydrates utilising the energy released from chemical reactions in the same way that photosynthetic organisms utilise light energy. The carbohydrates produced by chemosynthetic microbes can then be consumed by other organisms, forming the basis of the hydrothermal vent food chain.

Different kinds of chemotropic organisms specialise in consuming particular chemicals. The bacteria that live in symbiosis with Riftia are sulfur-oxidising chemotrophs that utilise sulfides in their chemosynthesis. This form of chemosynthesis is referred to as thioautotrophy.

=== Bacterial symbiosis ===
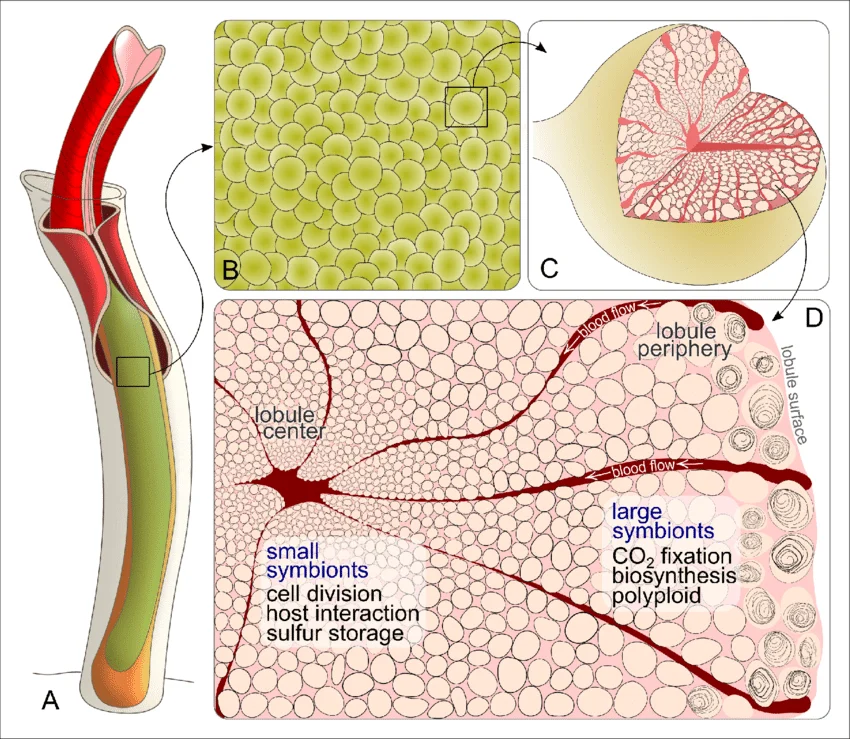
Riftia symbiont cells inside the trophosome. The spirals indicate symbionts being digested by the worm. A. Tube worm - B. Bacteriocytes within the trophosome - C. Cutaway of bacteriocyte - D. Bacteria in the bacteriocyte

Riftia worms live in symbiosis with the sulfur-oxidising bacteria inside their trophosome. The tube worm provides the bacteria with a stable supply of the chemicals required for chemosynthesis, and the bacteria are a source of nutrition that can be consumed by the tube worm.

==== Benefits of symbiosis for bacteria ====
In deep-sea hydrothermal vents, sulfur and oxygen are present in different areas. Seawater contains dissolved oxygen, while vent fluid is rich in sulfur (as sulfide), but poor in oxygen. However, sulfide that comes in contact with dissolved oxygen immediately forms oxidised sulfur compounds that cannot be used by the bacteria for chemosynthesis.

This means that free-living sulfur-oxidising bacteria are forced to compete with oxygen for sulfur, while still needing access to oxygen for chemosynthesis. Because of this, most sulfur-oxidising bacteria can live only in narrow interface environments where both sulfide and oxygen are present, such as where vent fluid meets seawater. Bacteria that engage in symbiosis with animals like tubeworms benefit from the host's ability to move its plume between sulfide-rich and oxygen-rich areas to acquire both nutrients consistently.

==== Role of bacteria within the trophosome ====
Bacteria in the trophosome live inside specialised cells called bacteriocytes, and perform different tasks depending on their life stage. Younger bacteria are concentrated near the centre of the bacteriocyte where they primarily perform cell division, maintaining the bacterial population, while older, larger bacteria fix carbon through chemosynthesis, growing larger and eventually moving toward the periphery of the bacteriocyte where they are digested by the tube worm.

Symbionts in the Ritfia worm are known to accumulate and store sulfur, likely functioning as an energy reserve for times of sulfide deprivation. The larger, peripheral bacteria store less sulfur than smaller bacteria. This may aid in their digestion by the tube worm, as cells with less sulfur are less toxic and easier for the worm to consume.

==== Chemical process of thioautotrophic chemosynthesis ====
Riftia worms take in hydrogen sulfide, carbon dioxide, and oxygen from the mineral-rich vent environment through their plume. These chemicals pass into the tube worm's blood, where they are bound by hemoglobin and transported to the trophosome. The bacterial symbionts then utilise these chemicals to perform chemosynthesis. The simplified chemical equation for this process is:

+ +→+ +

Because R. pachyptila must uptake CO_{2.} for its metabolism, CO_{2} uptake in the worm is enhanced by the higher pH of its blood (7.3–7.4), which favours the bicarbonate ion and promotes a steep gradient across which CO_{2} diffuses into the vascular blood of the plume.

Once the CO_{2} is fixed by the symbionts, it can be consumed by the host tissues. The fixed carbon is transported via organic molecules from the trophosome in the hemolymph.

The bacteria produce waste products as a result of their chemosynthesis, primarily H+ and SO, and depend on the Riftia worm to remove them. Waste products are carried away and expelled (likely through the plume) via the worm's haemolymph.

==== Symbiont acquisition ====
The symbiotic bacteria, on which adult worms depend for sustenance, are not present in the larvae. They are acquired from the environment. Free-living bacteria found in the water column are ingested randomly and enter the worm through a ciliated opening of the branchial plume. This opening is connected to the trophosome through a duct that passes through the brain. Once the bacteria are in the gut, the ones that are beneficial to the individual are engulfed (phaghocytized) by epithelial cells in the midgut and retained. Bacteria that do not represent possible endosymbionts are digested.

===== Endosymbiont species =====
A wide range of bacterial diversity is associated with symbiotic relationships with R. pachyptila. Many of these bacteria belong to the phylum Campylobacterota, such as Sulfurovum riftiae. Other symbionts belong to the classes Delta-, Alpha- and Gammaproteobacteria.

The Candidatus Endoriftia persephone (Gammaproteobacteria) is a facultative R. pachyptila symbiont and has been shown to be a mixotroph, thereby exploiting both Calvin Benson cycle and reverse TCA cycle (with an unusual ATP citrate lyase) according to availability of carbon resources and whether it is free living in the environment or inside a eukaryotic host. The bacteria apparently prefer a heterotrophic lifestyle when carbon sources are available.

16S rRNA analysis affirms that R. pachyptila chemoautotrophic bacteria belong to two different clades: Gammaproteobacteria and Campylobacterota (e.g. Sulfurovum riftiae) that get energy from the oxidation of inorganic sulfur compounds such as hydrogen sulfide (H_{2}S, HS^{−}, S^{2-}) to synthesize ATP for carbon fixation via the Calvin cycle.

== History & discovery ==
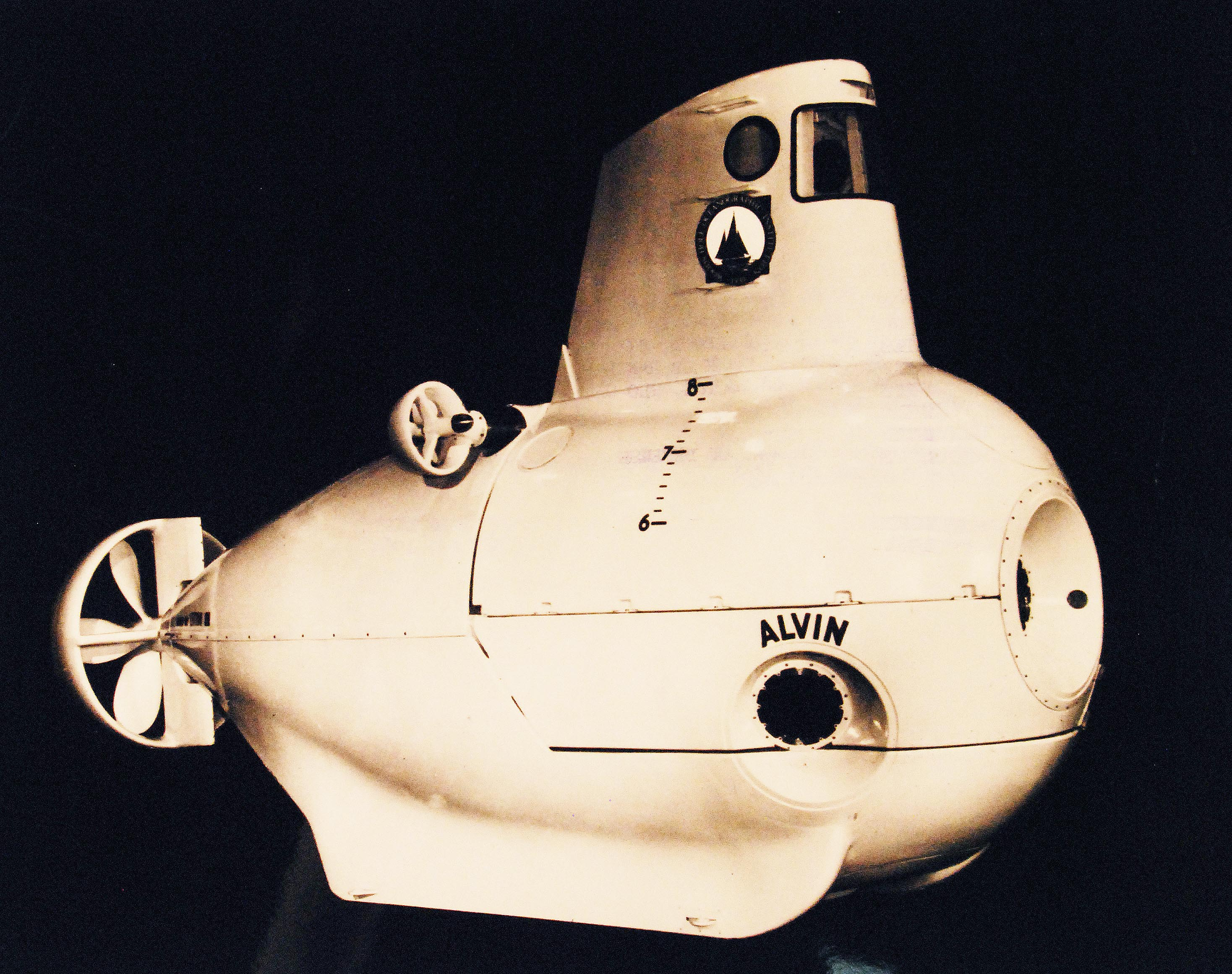
DSV Alvin, the US Navy research submarine used for the expedition.

R. pachyptila was first encountered in 1977 during a geological expedition by Jack Corliss to the Galápagos Rift. The initial purpose of the expedition was to prove the existence of hot springs (as hydrothermal vents) on the sea floor. These vents were assumed to be devoid of life, as the heat emitted from such vents averages around 350–380 °C (662–716 °F)).

However, the expedition observed a multitude of species found exclusively near hydrothermal vents, including Riftia, crabs, Bathymodiolus thermophilus and Calyptogena magnifica. The vent ecosystem at 00°48′15″N 86°13′29″W had such an abundance of giant tube worms that it was dubbed the "Rose garden" site, the "roses" referring to the red-plumed Riftia worms. While initially thought to be an isolated phenomenon, many such ecosystems have since been discovered on geologically active sections of the sea floor.

An 1985 expedition to the Rose garden site found that the Riftia were fewer in number, having been displaced by clams and mussels. Another expedition in 2002 found that it had been destroyed by a lava flow sometime in the prior decade, but a second vent ecosystem was found near the original site, dubbed "Rosebud".

The association between R. pachyptila and its symbionts was the first instance of symbiosis described for a marine invertebrate and chemoautotrophic bacteria. Initial evidence for chemoautotrophic symbiosis in R. pachyptila came from microscopic and biochemical analyses showing Gram-negative bacteria within a highly vascularized organ in the tubeworm's trunk. Chemosynthesis was first recognised within the trophosome by Colleen Cavanaugh.

== See also ==
- Siboglinidae
- Lamellibrachia – Genus of annelids
- Alvinella pompejana – Species of annelid
- Chemosynthesis
