= Maurice Caullery =

French biologist (1868–1958)

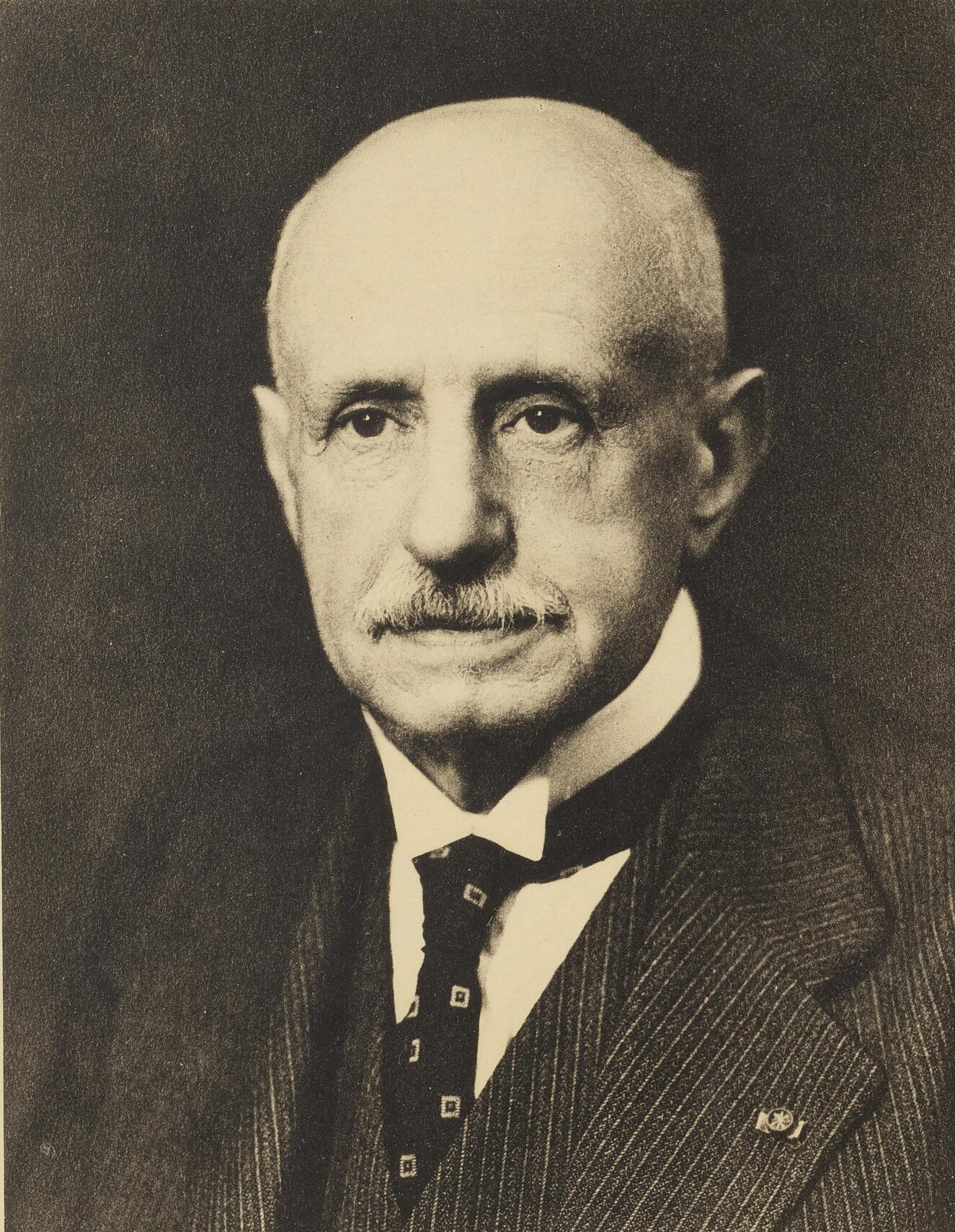
M. Caullery.

Maurice Jules Gaston Corneille Caullery (5 September 1868, Bergues – 13 July 1958, Paris) was a French biologist.

== Biography ==
He was born in Bergues in north France on 5 September 1868. His early education was in Douai.

He began as a lecturer in zoology at Lyon in 1897. From 1901 to 1903 he was a lecturer at the faculty of sciences in Marseille, and from 1903 to 1909, taught classes at the Sorbonne (laboratory of évolution des êtres organisés). In 1909 he succeeded Alfred Mathieu Giard (1846-1908) as director of the zoological station in Wimereux. In 1923 he opened a new laboratory of évolution des êtres organisés on Boulevard Raspail in Paris.

Caullery specialised in parasitic protozoans and marine invertebrates. He also worked on insects. His research of Siboglinum weberi was to become the foundation for establishing the family of beard worms known today as Siboglinidae. Also, he investigated how the various biological aspects of tunicates and annelids impacted their evolution.

In 1915 he was elected president of the Société zoologique de France, and later on in his career, he served as president of the Académie des Sciences (1945) and the Société de biologie (1946).

He died in Paris on 13 July 1958.

== Evolution ==
Caullery was an advocate of Lamarckian evolution and Mendelism. He argued that modern evolution had stopped and the Lamarckian mechanism had "run out of steam", leaving Mendelian processes in operation.

He argued that the inheritance of acquired characters was the main mechanism of evolution but it had only operated in the past.

== Awards ==
He was elected an Honorary Fellow of the Royal Society of Edinburgh in 1930 and an Honorary Fellow of the Royal Society in 1948.

He was awarded the Linnean Society of London's prestigious Darwin-Wallace Medal in 1958.

== Selected writings ==
- Les universités et la vie scientifique aux États-Unis (1917)
- Les problèmes de la sexualité (1919)
- Le Parasitime et la symbiosis (1922)
- Le Problème de l'évolution (1931)
- Present Theories of Evolution and the Problem of Adaptation (1933)
- Organisme et sexualité (1942)
- Parasitism and Symbiosis (1952)
- Genetics and Heredity (1964)
- A History of Biology (1966)
