= Frenulata =

Scientific classification
- Kingdom: Animalia
- Phylum: Annelida
- Clade: Pleistoannelida
- Clade: Sedentaria
- Order: Sabellida
- Family: Siboglinidae
- Clade: Frenulata

Clade of Siboglinidae

Frenulata, "beard worms", is a clade of Siboglinidae, "tube worms". They are one of four lineages with numerous species. They may be the most basal clade in the family. Despite being the first tube worms to be encountered and described, they remain the least studied group. This is because of their slender shape, they often get destroyed as a result of being caught as bycatch or poor preservation. They are found primarily in deep, muddy sediments, cold seeps, and anoxic firth sediments.

== Anatomy ==
Frenulata are typically long and slender, they have been described as "thread-like". They typically range from 0.1–3 mm in diameter. Like other Siboglinidae, they have distinct segments: a plume, a vestimentum, and a trophosome. The vestimentum is used to retract the organism in and out of its tube. The trophosome is unique to tube worms. It was found to house bacterial symbiotes in Riftia. Like other tube worms, they lack a digestive tract. In order to survive, it holds endosymbiotic bacteria that supply the worm with nutrients. The bacteria nourishes the worm by oxidizing sulfur from its surrounding environment, with one methanotrophic exception being Siboglinum poseidoni. The inorganic compounds are delivered to the trophosome by both the vascular and coelomic systems. Frenulata are unique in that they all have a mid-trunk girdle, spermatophores, sparse peg-like chaetae, and a tube with the posterior end open. The tube serves to provide structure for this soft-bodied animal as well as place the organism in an optimal position to obtain nutrients.

== Ecology ==
Frenulata are one of four clades of Siboglinidae, they are also the most diverse. Despite that, the endosymbiotic bacterial diversity remains largely unknown due to their small size and difficult to reach habitats. They often serve as environmental engineers with their tubes, changing the composition of the sediment. There is evidence that they are symbiote-flexible, meaning they can utilize different species of bacteria in order to best adapt to their environments. This however is still a contested theory with conflicting reports.
