= Escarpia =

- Escarpia spicata

Scientific classification
- Kingdom: Animalia
- Phylum: Annelida
- Clade: Pleistoannelida
- Clade: Sedentaria
- Order: Sabellida
- Family: Siboglinidae
- Genus: Escarpia; Jones, 1985

Genus of annelid worms

Escarpia is a genus of polychaetes belonging to the family Siboglinidae.

The species of this genus are found in Northern America, Eastern Asia.

Species:

- Escarpia laminata Jones, 1985
- Escarpia southwardae Andersen et al., 2004
- Escarpia spicata Jones, 1985
