= Meredith Leam Jones =

American zoologist (1926–1996)

- Born: 1926
- Died: 1996 (aged 69–70)
- Education: University of California
- Scientific career
- Fields: Zoology
- Workplaces: Florida State University; Department of Living Invertebrates; American Museum of Natural History; Department of Invertebrate Zoology; National Museum of Natural History; Division of Worms

Meredith Leam Jones (1926–1996) was an American zoologist.

== Biography ==
Jones was born in 1926. He received a bachelor's degree in invertebrate zoology in 1948. In 1952, he received a Ph.D. from the University of California at Berkeley. Starting from 1957 to 1960, he was an assistant professor at the Florida State University. He was an assisting curator from 1960 to 1964, at the Department of Living Invertebrates at the American Museum of Natural History. He accepted a position as an associate curator in 1964, in the Department of Invertebrate Zoology of the National Museum of Natural History. By 1970, he advanced to curator position in the Division of Worms in the Department of Invertebrate Zoology. He retired in 1989, and by 1996 died. His research was focused on systematics of polychaete worms, which can be found in hydrothermal vents on eastern Pacific.
