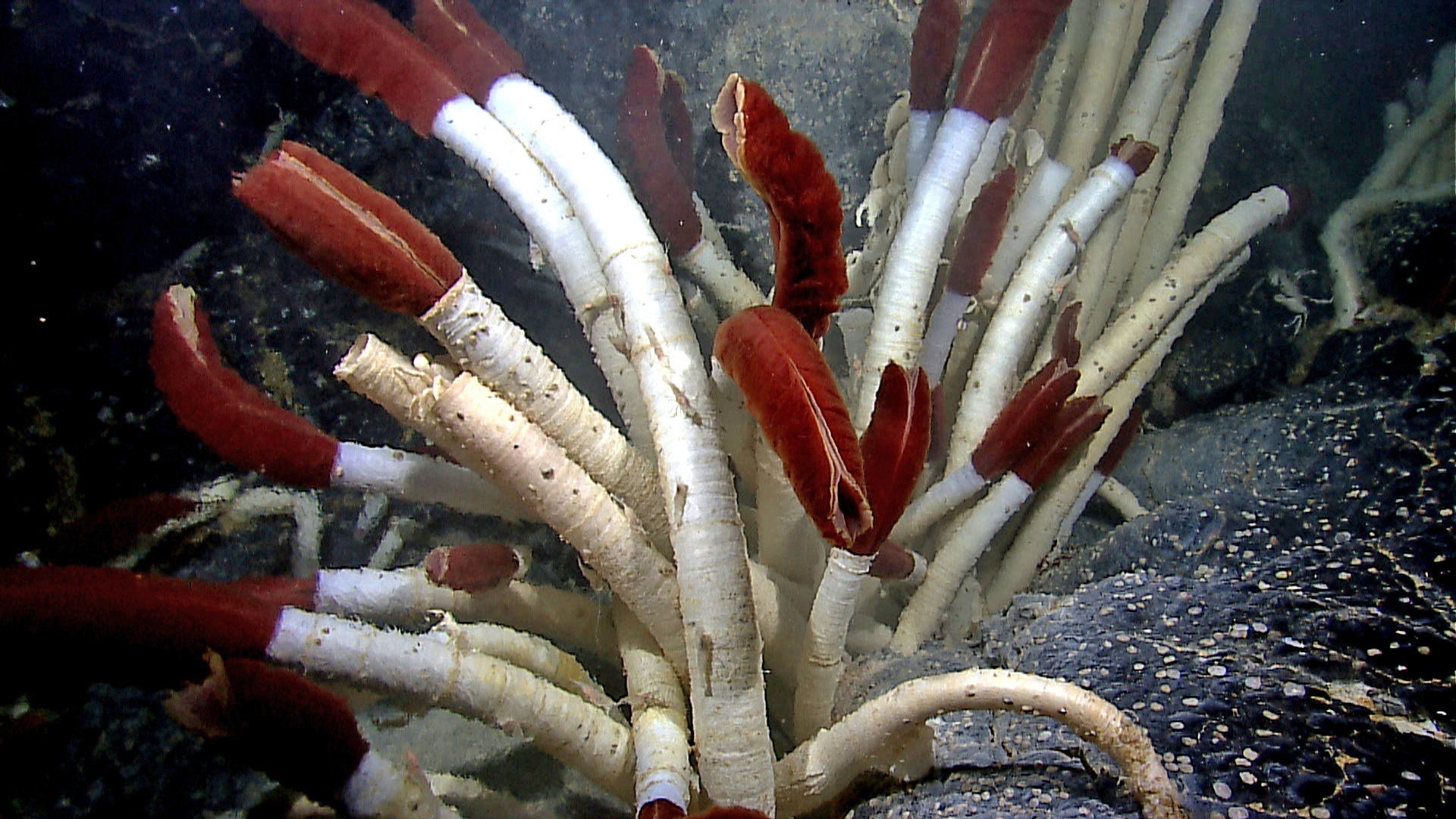
- Riftia pachyptila

Scientific classification
- Kingdom: Animalia
- Phylum: Annelida
- Clade: Pleistoannelida
- Clade: Sedentaria
- Infraclass: Canalipalpata
- Order: Sabellida
- Family: Siboglinidae; Caullery, 1914

Genera
- See text

= Siboglinidae =

Siboglinidae Temporal range: Early Jurassic (Pliensbachian)-Present, 189.6–0 Ma Possible Miaolingian record

Family of annelid worms

Siboglinidae is a family of polychaete annelid worms whose members include the former phyla Pogonophora and Vestimentifera (the giant tube worms). The family is composed of around 100 species of vermiform creatures which live in thin tubes buried in sediment (Pogonophora) or in tubes attached to hard substratum (Vestimentifera) at ocean depths ranging from 100 to 10,000 m (300 to 32,800 ft). They can also be found in association with hydrothermal vents, methane seeps, sunken plant material, and whale carcasses.

The first specimen was dredged from the waters of Indonesia in 1900. These specimens were given to French zoologist Maurice Caullery who studied them for nearly 50 years.

== Anatomy ==
Most siboglinids are less than 1 millimetre (0.04 in) in diameter, but some species grow up to 10–75 centimetres (3.9–29.5 in) in length. They inhabit tubular structures composed of chitin which are fixed to rocks or other substrates. The tubes are often clustered together in large colonies.

The body cavity has a separate compartment in each of the first three regions of the body and extends into the tentacles. The opisthosoma has a coelomic chamber in each of its 5 to 23 segments, separated by septa. The worms have a complex closed circulatory system and a well-developed nervous system, but as adults, siboglinids completely lack a mouth, gut, and anus.

Their bodies are divided into four regions. The anterior end is called the cephalic lobe, which ranges from one to over 200 thin branchial ciliated tentacles, each with tiny side branches known as pinnules. Behind this is a glandular forepart, which helps to secrete the tube. The main part of the body is the trunk, which is greatly elongated and bears various annuli, papillae, and ciliary tracts. Posterior to the trunk is the short metamerically segmented opisthosoma, bearing external paired chaetae, which help to anchor the animal to the base of its tube.

== Evolution ==
Wang et al. 2023

- - - Paraescarpia echinospica
    - - Riftia pachyptila
      - Ridgeia piscesae
  - Lamellibrachia lumeysi
- - Capitella teleta
  - - Helobdella robusta
    - Eisenia andrei

Part of a maximum likelihood phylogenetic tree based on single-copy orthologs of 14 metazoan taxa

The family Siboglinidae has been difficult to place in an evolutionary context. After examination of genetic differences between annelids, Siboglinidae were placed within the order Polychaeta by scientific consensus. The fossil record along with molecular clocks suggest the family has Mesozoic (250 – 66 Mya) or Cenozoic (66 Mya – recent) origins. However, some fossils of crystallized tubes are attributed to early Siboglinidae dating back to 500 Mya. The oldest definitive specimens referred to the family came from Early Jurassic (Pliensbachian-Toarcian) Figueroa Sulfide deposits from the San Rafael Mountains, found to be similar to modern Ridgeia. These tubes, known as 'Figueroa tubes', along with the 'Troodos collared tubes' (Cyprus, Turonian) were placed among modern vestimentiferans.

Molecular work aligning five genes has identified four distinct clades within Siboglinidae, These being Vestimentifera, Sclerolinum, Frenulata, and Osedax. Vestimentiferans live in vent and seep habitats. Separation of vestimentiferans into seep and deep-sea-dwelling clades is still debated due to some phylogenies based on sequencing data placing the genera along a continuum. Sclerolinum is a monogeneric clade (which may be called Monilifera) living on organic-rich remains. Frenulates live in organic-rich sediment habitats. Osedax is a monogeneric clade specialized in living on whale bones, although recent evidence shows them living on fish bones as well.

The following are cladograms of Siboglinidae:

Eichinger et al. 2013

- Myriochele (Outgroup)
- - Frenulata
    ⊞
    ⊟
    - Siboglinum ekmani
    - - - Galathealinum brachiosum
        - Polybrachia sp.
      - - Siphonobrachia ilyophora
        - Spirobrachia sp.
  - - Osedax
      - Osedax frankpressi
      - Osedax rubiplumus
    - - Sclerolinum
        - Sclerolinum brattstromi
        - Sclerolinum contortum
      - Vestimentifera
        ⊞
        ⊟
        - Lamellibrachia spp.
        - - Riftia pachyptila
          - - - Tevnia jerichoana
              - - Oasisia alvinae
                - Ridgeia piscesae
            - - Escarpiid (GU068290; undescribed)
              - - Paraescarpia sp.
                - - Escarpia spp.
                  - Seepiophila jonesi

Based on a Kimura 2-Parameter distance calculated on a 471-bp alignment of a 16S rRNA fragment.

Li et al. 2016

- ⊞Outgroup
  ⊟
  - Stemaspsis sp.
  - - Cirratulus spectabilis
    - Flabelligera mundata
- - Frenulata
    ⊞
    ⊟
    - Siboglinum fiordicum
    - - Galathealinum brachiosum
      - Siboglinum ekmani
  - - Osedax
      - Osedax rubiplumus
      - Osedax mucofloris
    - - Sclerolinum
        Sclerolinum brattstromi
      - Vestimentifera
        ⊞
        ⊟
        - Lamellibrachia luymesi
        - - Riftia pachyptila
          - - Ridgeia piscesae
            - - Seepiophila jonesi
              - Escarpia spicata

Based on a phylogenetic tree using supermatrix approach and a Bayesian inference approach with a CAT-GTR model.

== Genera ==
- Clade Frenulata
  - Birsteinia
  - Bobmarleya
  - Choanophorus
  - Crassibrachia
  - Cyclobrachia
  - Diplobrachia
  - Galathealinum
  - Heptabrachia
  - Lamellisabella
  - Nereilinum
  - Oligobrachia
  - Paraescarpia
  - Polybrachia
  - Siboglinoides
  - Siboglinum
  - Siphonobrachia
  - Spirobrachia
  - Unibrachium
  - Volvobrachia
  - Zenkevitchiana
- Clade Monilifera
  - Sclerolinum
- Clade Vestimentifera
  - Alaysia
  - Arcovesia
  - Escarpia
  - Lamellibrachia
  - Oasisia
  - Ridgeia
  - Riftia
  - Tevnia
- incertae sedis
  - Osedax

== Vestimentiferans ==
Like other tube worms, vestimentiferans are benthic marine creatures. Riftia pachyptila, a vestimentiferan, is known only from the hydrothermal vent systems.

Cladogram based on a maximum likelihood tree of concatenated 16-gene nucleotide data:

- Sclerolinum brattstromi
- - - Lamellibrachia barhami
    - - Lamellibrachia satsuma
      - - Lamellibrachia columna
        - - Lamellibrachia luymesi
          - Lamellibrachia donwalshi
  - - Riftia pachyptila
    - - - Paraescarpia echinospica
        - - Seepiophila jonesi
          - - Escarpia spicata
            - Escarpia "laminata"
      - - - Tevnia jerichonana
          - - Ridgeia piscesae
            - - Oasisia alvinae
              - Oasisia sp. nov.
        - - Arcovestia ivanovi
          - - Alaysia spiralis
            - Alaysia solwarawarriors

=== Anatomy of vestimentiferans ===
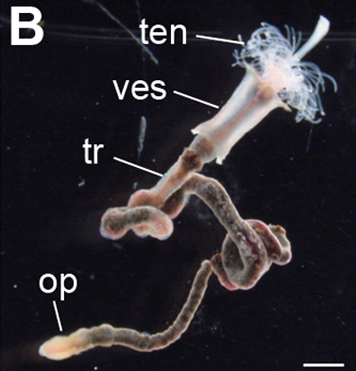
Lamellibrachia satsuma removed from its tube: op = opisthosome, ves = vestimentum, ten = tentacular region, tr = trunk

Vestimentiferan bodies are divided into four regions: the obturaculum, vestimentum, trunk, and opisthosome. The main trunk of the body bears wing-like extensions. Unlike other siboglinids that never have a digestive tract, they have one that they completely lose during metamorphosis.

The obturaculum is the first anterior body part. It is possible that the obturaculum is actually an outgrowth of the vestimentum rather than a separate body segment which would distinguish it from other siboglinids.

The vestimentum, from which the group's name is derived, is a wing-like body part with glands that secrete the tube. In a ventroanterior position in the vestimentum is the brain which is postulated to be simpler than relatives that maintain a gut in the adult form. The opisthosome is the anchoring rear body part.

=== Vestimentiferan ecology ===
Their primary nutrition is derived from the sulfide-rich fluids emanating from the hydrothermal vents where they live. The sulfides are metabolized by symbiotic hydrogen sulfide- or methane-oxidizing bacteria living in an internal organ, the trophosome. One gram of trophosome tissue can contain one billion bacteria. The origin of this symbiotic relationship is not currently known. The bacteria appear to colonize the host animal larvae after they have settled on a surface, entering them through their skin. This method of entry, known as horizontal transmission, means that each organism may have different species of bacteria assisting in this symbiosis. However, these bacteria all play similar roles in sustaining the vestimentiferans. Endosymbionts have a wide variety of metabolic genes, which may allow them to switch between autotrophic and heterotrophic methods of nutrient acquisition. When the host dies, the bacteria are released and return to the free-living population in the seawater.

Discovery of the hydrothermal vents in the eastern Pacific Ocean was quickly followed by the discovery and description of new vestimentiferan tubeworm species. These tubeworms are one of the most dominant organisms associated with the hydrothermal vents in the Pacific Ocean. Tubeworms anchor themselves to the substratum of the hydrocarbon seep by roots located at the basal portion of their bodies. Intact tubeworm roots have proven very difficult to obtain for study because they are extremely delicate, and often break off when a tubeworm is removed from hypothermal vent regions. How long the roots of the tube worms can grow is unknown, but roots have been recovered longer than 30 m.

A single aggregation of tubeworms can contain thousands of individuals, and the roots produced by each tubeworm can become tangled with the roots of neighbouring tubeworms. These mats of roots are known as "ropes", and travel down the tubes of dead tubeworms, and run through holes in rocks. The diameter and wall thickness of the tubeworm roots do not appear to change with distance from the trunk portion of the tubeworm's body.

Like the trunk portion of the body, the roots of the vestimentiferan tubeworms are composed of chitin crystallites, which support and protect the tubeworm from predation and environmental stresses. Tubeworms build the external chitin structure themselves by secreting chitin from specialized glands located in their body walls.
