= Trophosome =

Organ containing endosymbionts

A trophosome is a highly vascularised organ found in some animals that houses symbiotic bacteria that provide food for their host. Trophosomes are contained by the coelom of tube worms (family Siboglinidae, e.g. the giant tube worm Riftia pachyptila) and in the body of symbiotic flatworms of the genus Paracatenula.

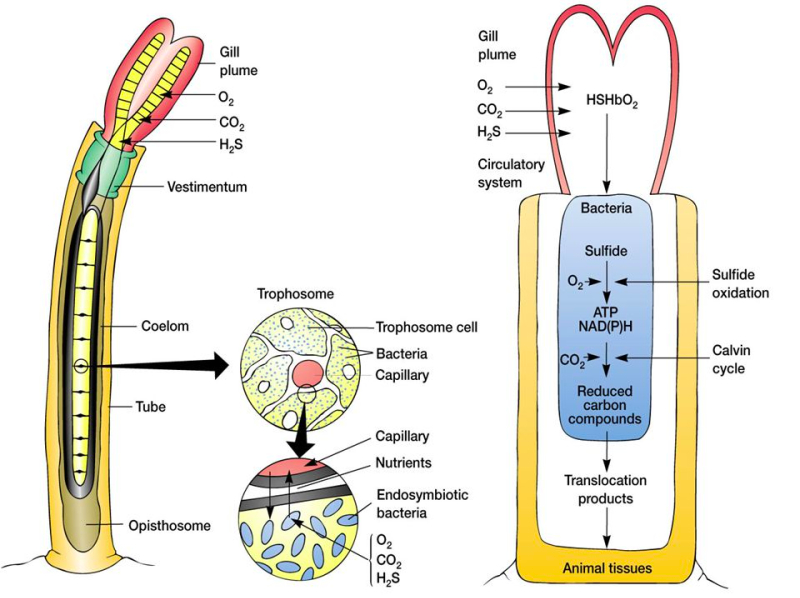
The trophosome of Riftia pachyptila.

== Organization ==
Initially, the trophosome in frenulates and vestimentiferans, which are now classified as members of the Siboglinidae, had been identified as a mesodermal tissue. The discovery of bacteria inside the trophosomal tissue only occurred in 1981 when the ultrastructure of trophosome of several frenulate species and of Sclerolinum brattstromi was studied. The bacteriocytes and symbionts composed of 70.5% and 24.1% of the trophosome's volume respectively. Generally, trophosome extends over the entire trunk region between the two longitudinal blood vessels from immediately posterior to the ventral ciliary band of the forepart to the posterior end of the trunk delineated by the septum between trunk and first opisthosomal segment. The trophosome can be differentiated between anterior and a posterior area due to incremental changes in host tissue organization, the amount of bacteriocytes, the size and shape of symbionts. The trophosome consisted anteriorly of a small number of bacteriocytes and extensive mesenchyma, while the posterior of trophosome subsequently consisted of a large population of bacteriocytes and a peripheral peritoneum.

=== Bacteriocytes and symbionts ===
The bacteriocyte cytoplasm is abundant in glycogen and contains some electron-dense, round-shape granules. Mitochondria and the rough endoplastic reticulum are low in number. Throughout the anterior trophosome region, the nuclei were mainly oval but irregularity in the shape of the nuclei is observed in the posterior trophosome region. The cell wall of the symbionts composed of an outer membrane and a cytoplasmic membrane typical of gram-negative bacteria. Symbionts were often embedded separately in the symbiosome membrane adjacent to the bacterial cell wall except when they are proliferating. In such case, proliferating symbionts are frequently found in the anterior trophosome region.

=== Structural organization ===
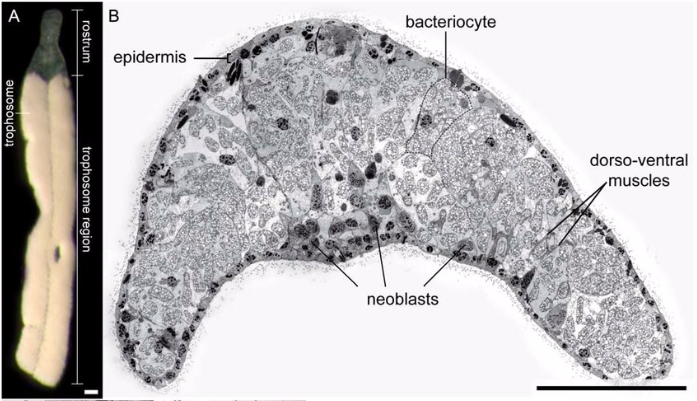
(A) Squeeze preparation of a live Paracatenula galateia specimen under incident light showing the smooth, silky appearance of the trophosome and the transparent rostrum. (B) TEM trophosome region cross section. One bacteriocyte (surrounded by a dashed line), the thin epidermis, neoblast stem cells and dorso-ventral muscles are labeled.

==== In frenulates ====
In frenulates, the trophosome is limited to the post-annular portion of the trunk. While a structural variant of the frenulate trophosome seems to occur, this organ typically consists of two epithelium and blood spaces sandwiched between the basal matrix of the epithelia in which the inner one is composed of bacteriocytes and the outer one is the coelomic lining. The trophosome of Sclerolinum brattstromi consists of a centre of bacteriocytes surrounded by blood space and epithelium.

==== In vestimentiferans ====
The trophosome of vestimentiferans is a complex, multi-lobed body with a vascular blood system that covers the entire trunk region. Each lobule consists of a tissue of bacteriocytes enclosed by an aposymbiotic coelothel. It is traversed by an axial efferent blood vessel, and is supplied with ramifying peripheral afferent blood vessels.

==== In Osedax ====
In Osedax, only the female has the trophosome. The trophosome in Osedax is made up of non symbiotic bacteria that reside between the muscle layer of the body's wall and the peritoneum in the ovisac and root regions; therefore, it is derived from the somatic mesoderm.

== Trophosome color ==
The host lacks entirely a digestive system but derives all the essential nutrients from its endosymbiont . The host in turn provides the endosymbiont with all necessary inorganic compounds for chemolithoautotrophy. Inorganic elements, such as hydrogen sulphide, are oxidized by bacteria to produce energy for carbon fixation. Trophosome tissue containing large quantities of concentrated sulphur has a light yellowish color. During sulfur limitation, i.e. when energy supply is reduced due to low concentrations of environmental sulfur, the stored sulfur is absorbed and the trophosome appears much darker. Therefore, the energetic state of the symbiosis can be specifically interpreted from the color of the trophosome.

== Trophosome growth ==
Trophosome tissue development happens by stem cells in the center of each lobule, contributing to new lobules as well as the regeneration of bacteriocytes circulating from the center to the periphery of each lobule through which apoptosis happens. The trophosome tissue thus not only shows high levels of proliferation but also fairly small levels of apoptosis. Furthermore, symbionts in the periphery are constantly digested and replaced by separating symbionts in the middle.

Lysophosphatidylethanolamines and free fatty acids are the products of phospholipid hydrolysis by phospholipases through the normal degradation of the membranes. The presence of fairly high levels of lysophosphatidylethanolamines and fatty acids in trophosome indicate the high turnover of host and symbiont cells in the trophosome contributing to tissue and membrane degradation.

== Chemolithoautotrophy ==
In both these animals, the symbiotic bacteria that live in the trophosome oxidize sulfur or sulfide found in the worm's environment and produce organic molecules by carbon dioxide fixation that the hosts can use for nutrition and as an energy source. This process is known as chemosynthesis or chemolithoautotrophy.

=== Carbon transfer ===
Two different modes of carbon transfer from the symbionts to the host have been suggested.

- The transfer of nutrients through digestion of bacteria. This model is supported by the ultrastructural studies of the trophosome showing symbionts in various stages of lysis.
- The transfer of nutrients through small nutritive molecules released by bacteria. The only strong evidence for this hypothesis is the discovery by Felbeck and Jarchow (1998) that the distilled symbionts release substantial quantities of succinate and, to a lesser degree, glutamate in vitro, indicating that these could be the main compounds transmitted from the symbionts to the host in vivo.

=== Carbon fixation ===
Trophosome observed high activity of ribulose-1,5-bisphosphate carboxylase / oxygenase and ribulose 5-phosphate kinase, the enzymes of the Calvin-Benson CO_{2} fixation cycle. It is important to notice that the observed activities of two enzymes, ribulose-1,5-bisphosphate carboxylase / oxygenase and ribulose 5-phosphate kinase, are present at high concentrations in the trophosome, but are absent in the muscle. Furthermore, rhodanese, APSreductase, and ATP-sulfurylase are involved in adenosine triphosphate synthesis using the energy found in sulfur compounds such as hydrogen sulphide. These findings contribute to the conclusion that the symbiont of R. pachyptila is capable of producing ATP by means of sulfide oxidation, and that ATP energy could be used to fix carbon dioxide.

== Glycogen storage in trophosome ==
In Riftia pachyptila, the glycogen content of 100 μmol glycosyl units g^{−1} fresh wt determined in the trophosome is divided equally between host and symbionts. Although the symbionts take up only 25% of the trophosome, glycogen content is distributed equally between both partners, and this ratio remains similar for up to 40 h of hypoxia. Thus, host and symbiont each contain about 50 μmol glycosyl units g^{−1} fresh wt of trophosome. This amount is comparable to that in other host tissues of R. pachyptila, e.g. in the body wall (35 μmol glycosyl units g^{−1} fresh wt) or the vestimentum (20 μmol glycosyl units g^{−1} fresh wt), to that of other chemoautotrophic symbiotic animals and to that of nonsymbiotic animals known to be adapted to long-term anoxic periods.

== Host-microbe interaction ==
=== Protection against oxidative damage ===
Higher concentration of oxygen in the trophosome, (partial) anaerobic metabolism of the host, and host ROS-detoxifying enzymes in this tissue will not only shield the symbionts from oxidative damage but also minimize competition between the host and its oxygen symbionts.

=== Symbiont population control ===
Symbiont population control can be largely the result of symbiont digestion, which essentially prevents symbionts from escaping from their compartments and/or overgrowing the host. Nevertheless, the immune system can incorporate in phage defence and symbiont recognition during symbiosis.

=== Communication between host and microbe ===
The host communication may be involving the eukaryote-like protein structure. These symbiont proteins which number more than 100 in the trophosome samples suggest a symbiotic-relevant role. Ankyrin repeats were believed to assist in the protein-protein interactions. The ankyrin repeat proteins could interact directly with the host proteins in order to modulate endosome maturation and interfere with host symbiont digestion.

== See also ==
- Bacteriome — organ found in some insects that contains endosymbiotic bacteria
- Symbiosis
- Siboglinidae
- Bacteriocyte
