= Tube worm =

A tubeworm is any worm-like sessile invertebrate that anchors its tail to an underwater surface and secretes around its body a mineral tube, into which it can withdraw its entire body.

Tubeworms are found among the following taxa:

- Annelida, the phylum containing segmented worms
  - Polychaetea, the class containing bristle worms
    - Canalipalpata, the order containing bristle-footed annelids or fan-head worms
      - Siboglinidae, the family of beard worms
        - Riftia pachyptila, a species known as giant tube worms
        - Lamellibrachia, a related genus
      - Sabellidae, the family containing feather duster worms
        - Serpulidae, sabellids with a specialized operculum
- Phoronida, the phylum containing horseshoe worms
- Microconchida, an order of extinct tubeworms
- Kuphus polythalamia, a bivalve mollusk species whose common name is giant tube worm
