= Scutellina gruveli =

Scientific classification
- Kingdom: Animalia
- Phylum: Mollusca
- Class: Gastropoda
- Order: Cycloneritida
- Family: Phenacolepadidae
- Genus: Scutellina
- Species: S. gruveli

Binomial name
- Scutellina gruveli Dautzenberg, 1929

Species of gastropod

Scutellina gruveli is a species of sea snail, a marine gastropod mollusk in the family Phenacolepadidae.

== Etymology ==
The snail is named after Jean Abel Gruvel
