= Scutellina =

Scientific classification
- Kingdom: Animalia
- Phylum: Mollusca
- Class: Gastropoda
- Order: Cycloneritida
- Family: Phenacolepadidae
- Subfamily: Phenacolepadinae
- Genus: Scutellina; Gray, 1847

Genus of gastropods

Scutellina is a genus of small limpet-like sea snails, marine gastropod mollusks in the family Phenacolepadidae.

Scutellina is now a synonym of Plesiothyreus Cossmann, 1888

== Species ==
Species within the genus Scutellina include:

- Scutellina gruveli Dautzenberg, 1929
