= Jean Abel Gruvel =

French marine biologist (1870–1941)

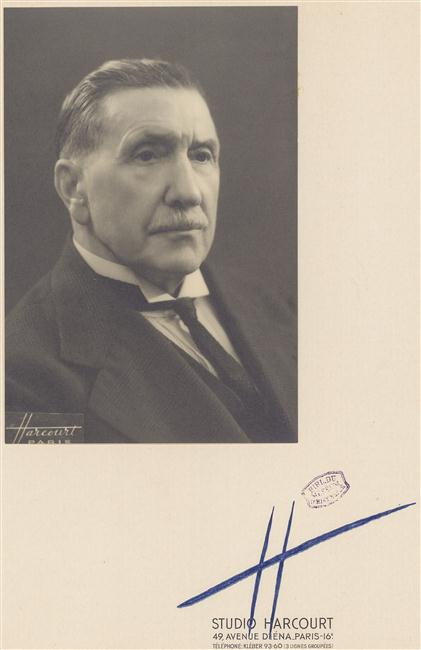

Jean Abel Gruvel (14 February 1870 in Le Fleix – 18 August 1941 in Dinard) was a French marine biologist known for his research of cirripedes.

== Biography ==
In 1894 he obtained his doctorate in sciences, and later taught classes in zoology for three years at the faculty of sciences at Bordeaux. In 1902 he founded the Société d'études et de vulgarisation de la zoologie agricole in Bordeaux. Later on, he was a professor at the Muséum national d'histoire naturelle in Paris, and was chair of the commission for the regulation of whaling for French West Africa and of the committee for the protection of colonial fauna and flora.

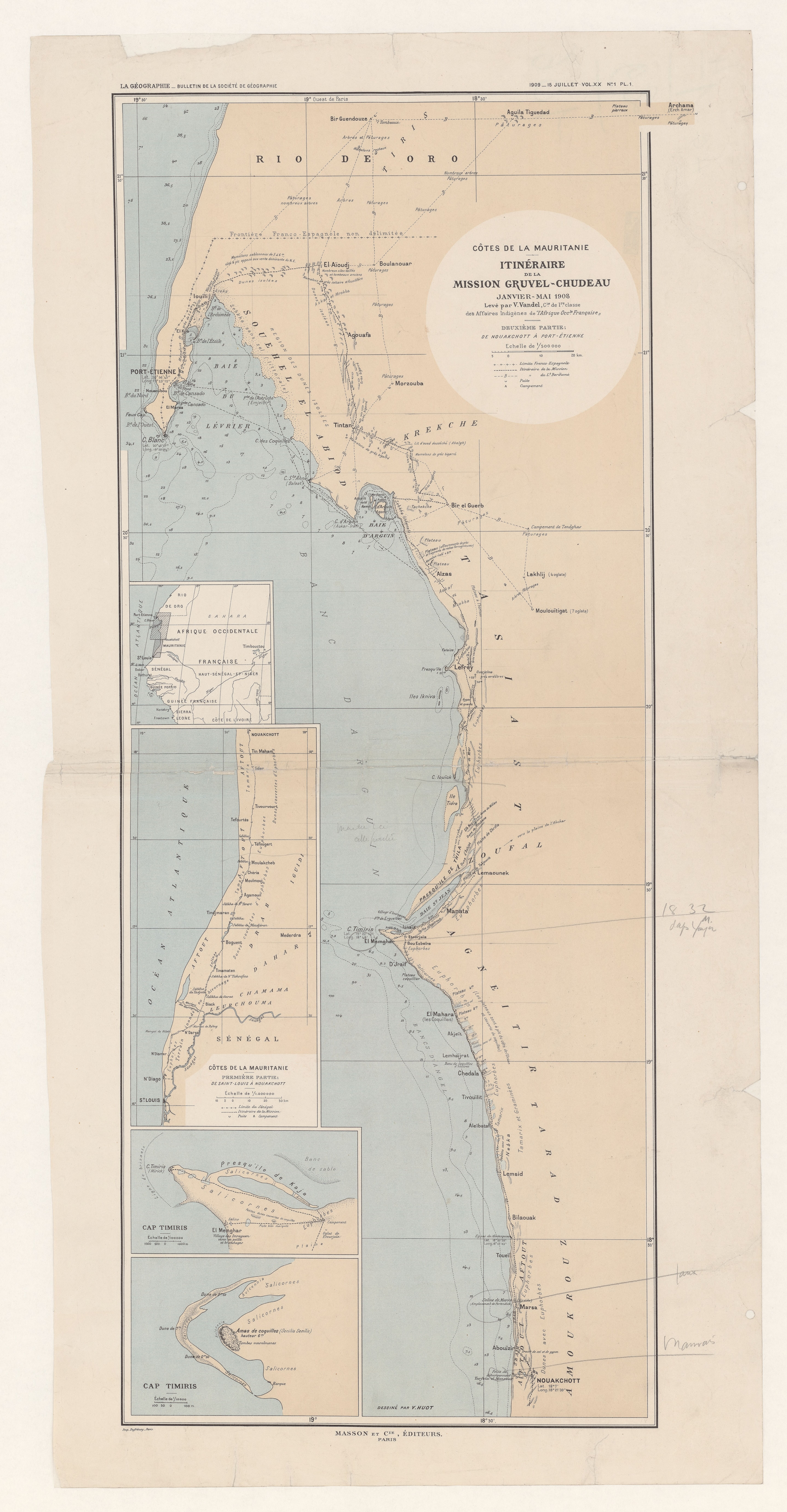
Coasts of Mauritania map drawn by Victor Huot from survey by V. Vandel (Itinerary of the Jean Abel Gruvel - René Chudeau mission, January-May 1908)

He was a member of the Conseil supérieur des colonies, of which, he served as vice-president of the department dealing with public works, merchant marine and fisheries, covering the western coast of Africa. Also, he was instrumental in the development of the Service océanographique des pêches de l'Indochine and in the establishment of research laboratories in Martinique, Guadeloupe, Réunion and New Caledonia. In 1933 he became head of the marine laboratory at the Museum, and in 1935, took on a similar role at the laboratory in Dinard (Aquarium et Musée de la Mer de Dinard).

== Taxa ==
He was the taxonomic authority of the crustacean subclass Thecostraca and of several families within this grouping; Tetraclitidae, Lithotryidae, Oxynaspididae, Anelasmatidae, Acrothoracica, Dendrogastridae, Lauridae, Petrarcidae and Synagogidae.

== Taxa described by him ==
- See Category:Taxa named by Jean Abel Gruvel

== Taxa named in his honor ==
- The genera Gruvelia (family Chromodoridae) and Gruvelialepas (family Calanticidae) commemorate his name, as do taxa with the specific epithets of gruveli and gruvelianum.
- The Guinea flathead (Solitas gruveli) is a species of marine ray-finned fish belonging to the family Platycephalidae, the flatheads. Gruvel is the collector of the type specimen.
- Gibberula gruveli is a species of very small sea snail, a marine gastropod mollusk or micromollusk in the family Cystiscidae.
- Labeobarbus gruveli is a species of ray-finned fish in the genus Labeobarbus which is known only from the Dubreka River in Guinea.

- Eucithara gruveli is a small sea snail, a marine gastropod mollusk in the family Mangeliidae.
- Kongsrudia gruveli is a species of sea snail, a marine gastropod mollusk in the family Pyramidellidae, the pyrams and their allies.
- Nymphon gruveli Bouvier, 1910,
- Gruvelialepas Newman, 1980,
- Turbonilla gruveli Dautzenberg, 1913, is a species of sea snail, a marine gastropod mollusk in the family Pyramidellidae, the pyrams and their allies.
- Scutellina gruveli is a species of sea snail, a marine gastropod mollusk in the family Phenacolepadidae.
- Vaughtia gruveli (Dautzenberg, 1910), is a species of sea snail, a marine gastropod mollusk in the family Muricidae, the murex snails or rock snails.
- Teloscalpellum gruvelianum (Pilsbry, 1907),
- Natica gruveli Dautzenberg, 1910 is a species of predatory sea snail, a marine gastropod mollusk in the family Naticidae, the moon snails,
- Trophon gruveli Dautzenberg, 1910,
- Fustiaria gruveli (Dautzenberg, 1910),
- Leptogorgia gruveli Stiasny, 1936,
- Alcyonium gruveli Tixier-Durivault, 1955,
- Grammoplites gruveli (Pellegrin, 1905) were also named after him.

== Selected works ==
- Contribution à l'étude des Cirrhipèdes, 1893 – Contribution to the study of cirripedes.
- Expéditions scientifiques du "Travailleur" et du "Talisman" : Cirrhipèdes, 1902 – Scientific expeditions of the "Travailleur" and the "Talisman": Cirripedes.
- Monographie des Cirrhipèdes ou Thécostracés, 1905 – Monograph on cirripedes or Thecostraca.
- Les pêcheries de la côte occidentale d'Afrique, 1906 – The fisheries on the west coast of Africa.
- A travers la Mauritanie Occidentale: de Saint-Louis à Port-Etienne (two volumes 1909, 1911; with René Chudeau) – A crossing of western Mauritania : Saint-Louis – Port-Etienne.
- Mission Gruvel sur la Côte occidentale d'Afrique (1909-1910), 1912 – The Gruvel mission to the west coast of Africa in 1909–10.
- L'industrie des pêches sur la Côte occidentale d'Afrique, 1913 – The fishing industry on the west coast of Africa.
- Cirrhipèdes provenant des campagnes scientifiques de S. A. S. le Prince de Monaco (1885-1913), 1920 – Cirripedes from the scientific campaigns of the S. A. S. le Prince de Monaco (1885-1913).
- L'industrie des pêches sur la côte occidentale du Maroc, 1927 – The fishing industry on the west coast of Morocco.
