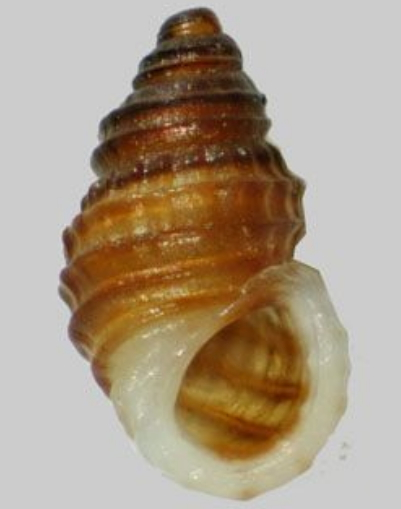
- Shell of Alvania poucheti

Scientific classification
- Kingdom: Animalia
- Phylum: Mollusca
- Class: Gastropoda
- Subclass: Caenogastropoda
- Order: Littorinimorpha
- Superfamily: Rissooidea
- Family: Rissoidae
- Genus: Alvania
- Species: A. poucheti

Binomial name
- Alvania poucheti Dautzenberg, 1889

Synonyms
- Alvania poucheti var. cingulifera Dautzenberg, 1889

= Alvania poucheti =

Species of gastropod

Alvania poucheti is a species of small sea snail, a marine gastropod mollusc or micromollusk in the family Rissoidae.

== Description ==
The length of the shell varies between 1.8 mm and 2 mm.

== Distribution ==
This species occurs in the Atlantic Ocean off the Azores.
