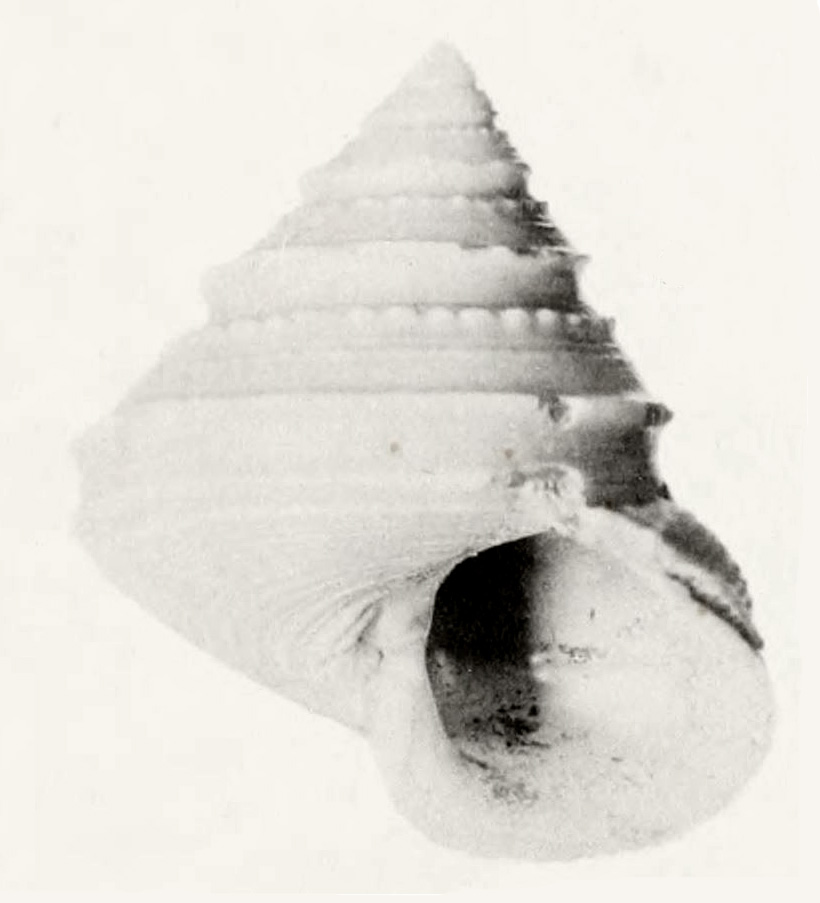
- Original photograph of the holotype shell of Calliostoma grimaldii

Scientific classification
- Kingdom: Animalia
- Phylum: Mollusca
- Class: Gastropoda
- Subclass: Vetigastropoda
- Order: Trochida
- Family: Calliostomatidae
- Genus: Calliostoma
- Species: C. grimaldii

Binomial name
- Calliostoma grimaldii Dautzenberg & H. Fischer, 1896

= Calliostoma grimaldii =

Species of gastropod

Calliostoma grimaldii is a species of sea snail, a marine gastropod mollusk in the family Calliostomatidae.

== Description ==
The height of the shell attains 20 mm. The imperforate shell is very solid. The spire has a regularly conical shape. It is composed of seven slightly convex whorls: two smooth embryonic whorls followed by two with cords decorated with three subequal, decumbent, granular ribs. The last whorls show at their top, near the suture, a decumbent rib and a little below the periphery of a protruding, very acute carina. Between this carina and the upper rib, there are some other almost obsolete ribs, sometimes slightly granular. On the body whorl a second carina arises at the corner of the outer lip. The base of the shell is decorated with concentric, flattened, close and uneven ribs. The growth lines are very thin and visible only with a magnifying glass. The round aperture has inwardly a pearly appearance. The columella is very thick and slightly arched. The outer lip is thickened inwardly at a small distance from the edge, which is sharp. The white color of the transparent shell show the nacre below, which is covered only by a thin outer layer.

== Distribution ==
This species is found at bathyal depths (1250 m to 2165 m) off the Azores.
