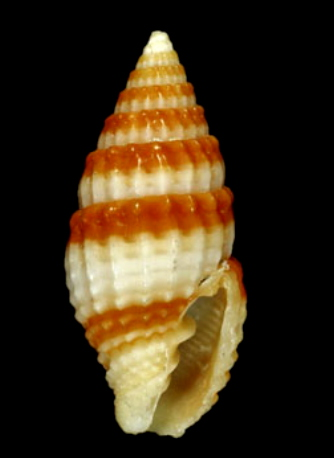
- Shell of Vexillum bizonale (specimen at the Natural History Museum Rotterdam)

Scientific classification
- Kingdom: Animalia
- Phylum: Mollusca
- Class: Gastropoda
- Subclass: Caenogastropoda
- Order: Neogastropoda
- Family: Costellariidae
- Genus: Vexillum
- Species: V. bizonale

Binomial name
- Vexillum bizonale (Dautzenberg & Bouge, 1923)

Synonyms
- Mitra affinis Reeve, 1844 (invalid: junior homonym of Mitra affinis Lesson, 1842); Mitra aureolata var. bizonalis Dautzenberg & Bouge, 1923 (basionym); Vexillum (Pusia) bizonale (Dautzenberg & Bouge, 1923); Vexillum (Pusia) unifasciale affinis (Reeve, 1844); Vexillum affinis (Reeve, 1844) ·

= Vexillum bizonale =

Species of gastropod

Vexillum bizonale is a species of small sea snail, marine gastropod mollusk in the family Costellariidae, the ribbed miters.

== Description ==
The length of the shell attains 19 mm.

== Distribution ==
This marine species occurs off New Caledonia and the Philippines; also in the Indian Ocean off Réunion.
