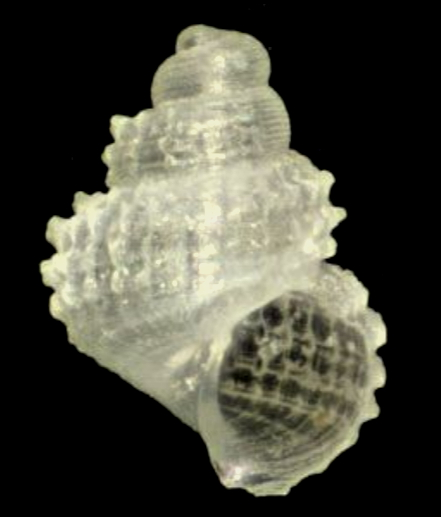
- Shell of Alvania lamellata (juvenile specimen) (specimen at the Natural History Museum, Rotterdam)

Scientific classification
- Kingdom: Animalia
- Phylum: Mollusca
- Class: Gastropoda
- Subclass: Caenogastropoda
- Order: Littorinimorpha
- Family: Rissoidae
- Genus: Alvania
- Species: A. lamellata

Binomial name
- Alvania lamellata Dautzenberg, 1889

= Alvania lamellata =

Species of gastropod

Alvania lamellata is a species of small sea snail, a marine gastropod mollusc or micromollusk in the family Rissoidae.

== Description ==
The length of the shell attains 2 mm.

== Distribution ==
This species occurs in the Atlantic Ocean off the Azores.
