= Eucithara gruveli =

Scientific classification
- Kingdom: Animalia
- Phylum: Mollusca
- Class: Gastropoda
- Subclass: Caenogastropoda
- Order: Neogastropoda
- Superfamily: Conoidea
- Family: Mangeliidae
- Genus: Eucithara
- Species: E. gruveli

Binomial name
- Eucithara gruveli (Dautzenberg, 1932)

Synonyms
- Glyphostoma gruveli Dautzenberg, 1932 (original combination)

Species of gastropod

Eucithara gruveli is a species of small sea snail, a marine gastropod mollusk in the family Mangeliidae.

== Description ==
The length of the shell attains 7.1 mm, its diameter 3.1 mm.

== Distribution ==
This marine species occurs off Madagascar.

== Etymology ==
The snail is named after Jean Abel Gruvel.
