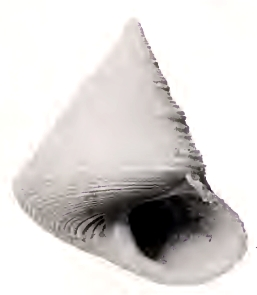
- Original drawing of a shell of Calliostoma hirondellei

Scientific classification
- Kingdom: Animalia
- Phylum: Mollusca
- Class: Gastropoda
- Subclass: Vetigastropoda
- Order: Trochida
- Family: Calliostomatidae
- Genus: Calliostoma
- Species: C. hirondellei

Binomial name
- Calliostoma hirondellei (Dautzenberg & H. Fischer, 1896)

= Calliostoma hirondellei =

Species of gastropod

Calliostoma hirondellei is a species of sea snail, a marine gastropod mollusk in the family Calliostomatidae.

== Description ==
The height of the shell attains 32 mm. The imperforated shell is very solid and thick. It is somewhat shiny. The spire has a regular conical shape. It contains eight whorls. The first ones are flat, the others somewhat concave. They are separated by a shallow suture. The embryonic whorls are smooth, the others are decorated with decurrent spiral striae (six on the penultimate whorl). The ridge closest to the suture is slightly granular. The very thin growth lines are oblique. The body whorl is slightly expanded. The base is convex and is ornamented with 11 to 13 concentric striae, somewhat less pronounced than the others and closer to each other. The subquadrangular aperture is pearly inside. Its edges are covered with a very thin callosity. The thick columella is oblique. The outer lip is declivitous and slightly widens at the top. On the inside it has a thick bead somewhat behind the sharp edge.

== Distribution ==
This species occurs in the Atlantic Ocean off the Azores at bathyal depths.
