= Calliostoma normani =

Scientific classification
- Kingdom: Animalia
- Phylum: Mollusca
- Class: Gastropoda
- Subclass: Vetigastropoda
- Order: Trochida
- Family: Calliostomatidae
- Genus: Calliostoma
- Species: C. normani

Binomial name
- Calliostoma normani (Dautzenberg & H. Fischer, 1897)

Synonyms
- Turcicula normani Dautzenberg & Fischer H. 1897 (original description)

Species of gastropod

Calliostoma normani is a species of sea snail, a marine gastropod mollusk in the family Calliostomatidae.

== Distribution ==
This species occurs in the Atlantic Ocean at bathyal depths off the Azores.
