= Turbonilla gitaena =

Scientific classification
- Kingdom: Animalia
- Phylum: Mollusca
- Class: Gastropoda
- Family: Pyramidellidae
- Genus: Turbonilla
- Species: T. gitaena

Binomial name
- Turbonilla gitaena Dautzenberg & Fischer H., 1897

Synonyms
- Turbonilla (Cylindriturbonilla) gitaena Dautzenberg & Fischer H., 1897

Species of gastropod

Turbonilla gitaena is a species of sea snail, a marine gastropod mollusk in the family Pyramidellidae, the pyrams and their allies.

== Description ==
The shell grows to a length of 4.2 mm.

== Distribution ==
This species occurs in the Atlantic Ocean in the bathyal zone off the Azores.
