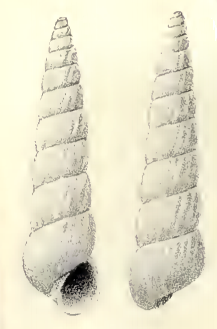
- Apertural and abapertural view of a shell of Turbonilla gruveli

Scientific classification
- Kingdom: Animalia
- Phylum: Mollusca
- Class: Gastropoda
- Family: Pyramidellidae
- Genus: Turbonilla
- Species: T. gruveli

Binomial name
- Turbonilla gruveli Dautzenberg, 1912

Synonyms
- Turbonilla gruveli var. multicostata Dautzenberg, 1912

= Turbonilla gruveli =

Species of gastropod

Turbonilla gruveli is a species of sea snail, a marine gastropod mollusk in the family Pyramidellidae, the pyrams and their allies.

== Distribution ==
This species occurs in the Atlantic Ocean off the estuary of the Congo River.

== Etymology ==
This snail is named after Jean Abel Gruvel.
