= Calliostoma lithocolletum =

Scientific classification
- Kingdom: Animalia
- Phylum: Mollusca
- Class: Gastropoda
- Subclass: Vetigastropoda
- Order: Trochida
- Family: Calliostomatidae
- Genus: Calliostoma
- Species: C. lithocolletum

Binomial name
- Calliostoma lithocolletum Dautzenberg, 1925

Species of gastropod

Calliostoma lithocolletum is a species of sea snail, a marine gastropod mollusk in the family Calliostomatidae.

== Description ==
The height of the shell attains 18 mm.

== Distribution ==
This species occurs in the Atlantic Ocean at bathyal depths off the Canary Islands; and off Senegal to Ghana.
