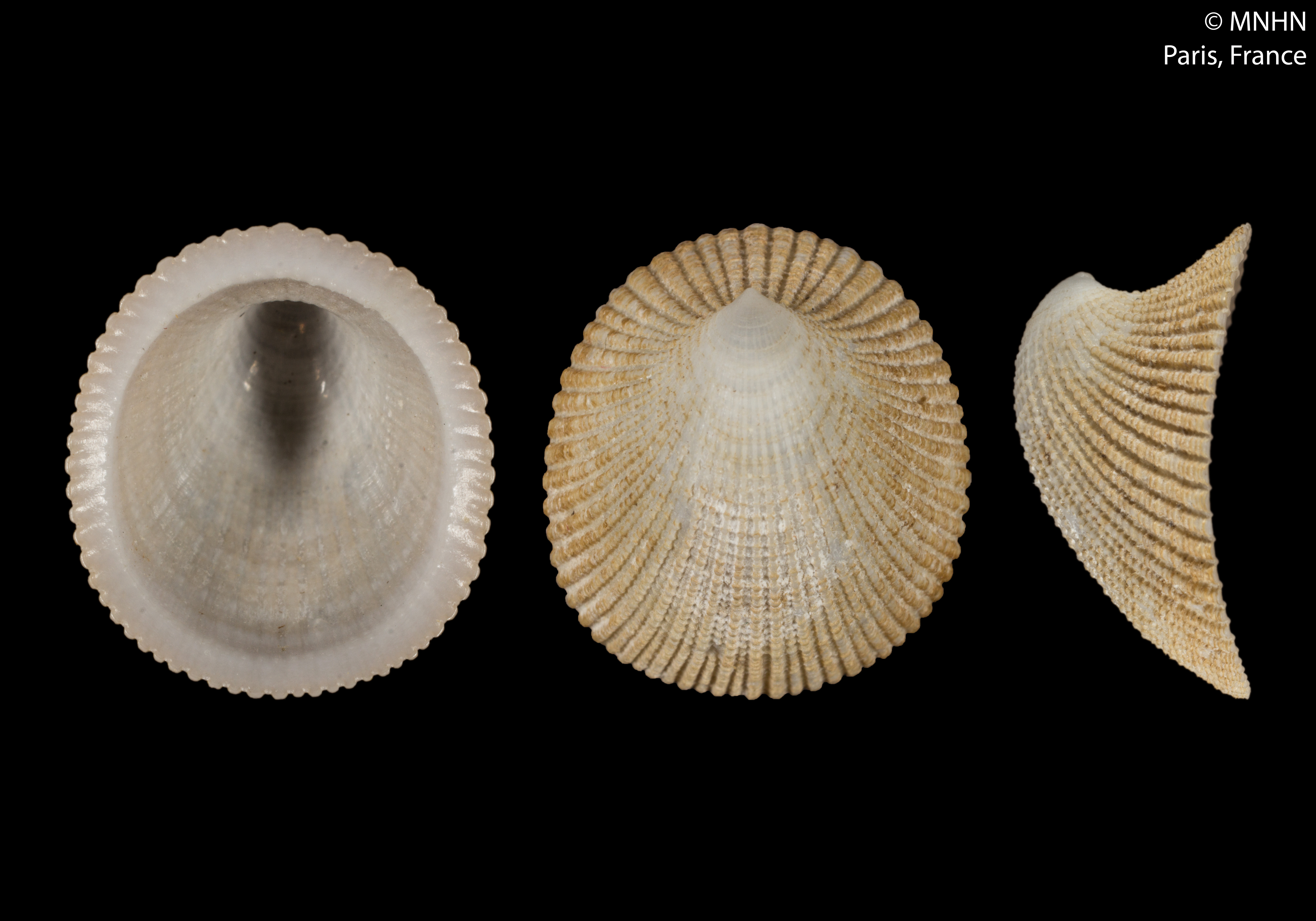
- Shell of Plesiothyreus cytherae (syntype at MNHN, Paris)

Scientific classification
- Kingdom: Animalia
- Phylum: Mollusca
- Class: Gastropoda
- Order: Cycloneritida
- Family: Phenacolepadidae
- Genus: Plesiothyreus
- Species: P. cytherae

Binomial name
- Plesiothyreus cytherae (Lesson, 1831)

Synonyms
- Phenacolepas crenulata (Broderip, 1834); Phenacolepas cytherae (Lesson, 1831); Phenacolepas mirabilis G. B. Sowerby III, 1910; Phenacolepas nobilis (G. B. Sowerby III, 1905); Pileopsis cytherae Lesson, 1831 (original combination); Scutella crenulata Broderip, 1834 (probable synonym); Scutellina nobilis G. B. Sowerby III, 1905

= Plesiothyreus cytherae =

Species of gastropod

Plesiothyreus cytherae is a species of sea snail, a marine gastropod mollusk in the family Phenacolepadidae.

== Description ==
The length of the shell attains 15.5 mm.

== Distribution ==
This marine species occurs off Tahiti.
