= Calliostoma caroli =

Scientific classification
- Kingdom: Animalia
- Phylum: Mollusca
- Class: Gastropoda
- Subclass: Vetigastropoda
- Order: Trochida
- Family: Calliostomatidae
- Genus: Calliostoma
- Species: C. caroli

Binomial name
- Calliostoma caroli (Dautzenberg, 1927)

Synonyms
- Calliostoma hedleyi Dautzenberg, Ph., 1925 (preoccupied name)

Species of gastropod

Calliostoma caroli is a species of sea snail, a marine gastropod mollusk in the family Calliostomatidae.

== Distribution ==
This species occurs in the Atlantic Ocean off the Azores.
