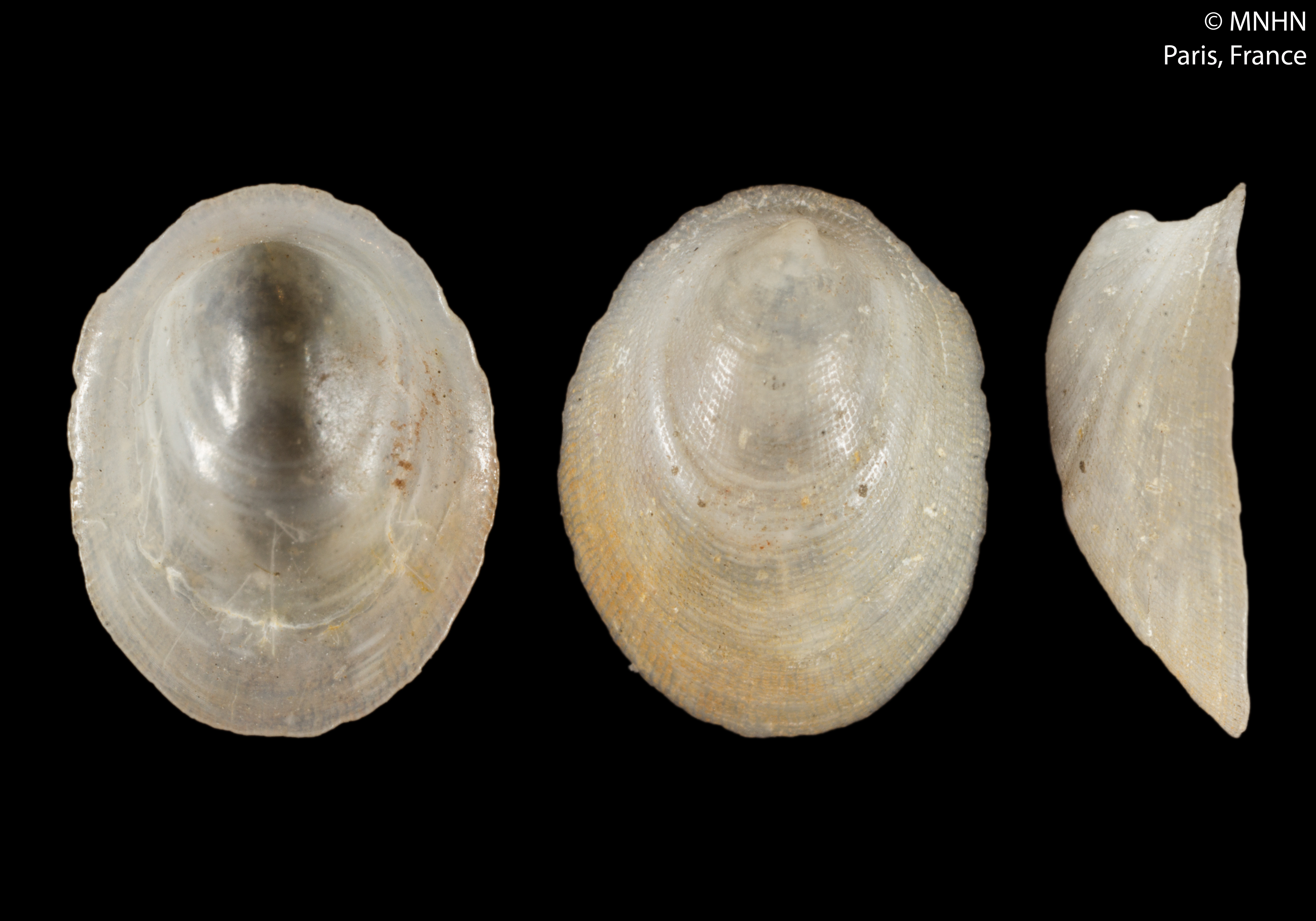
- Shell of Plesiothyreus hamillei (syntype at MNHN, Paris)

Scientific classification
- Kingdom: Animalia
- Phylum: Mollusca
- Class: Gastropoda
- Order: Cycloneritida
- Family: Phenacolepadidae
- Genus: Plesiothyreus
- Species: P. hamillei

Binomial name
- Plesiothyreus hamillei (P. Fischer, 1857)

Synonyms
- Acmaea hamillei P. Fischer, 1857 (original combination); Phenacolepas hamillei (P. Fischer, 1857); Scutellina antillarum Dall, 1889 (junior synonym)

= Plesiothyreus hamillei =

Species of gastropod

Plesiothyreus hamillei is a species of sea snail, a marine gastropod mollusk in the family Phenacolepadidae.

== Description ==
The length of the shell attains 7 mm.

== Distribution ==
This marine species occurs off Guadeloupe.
