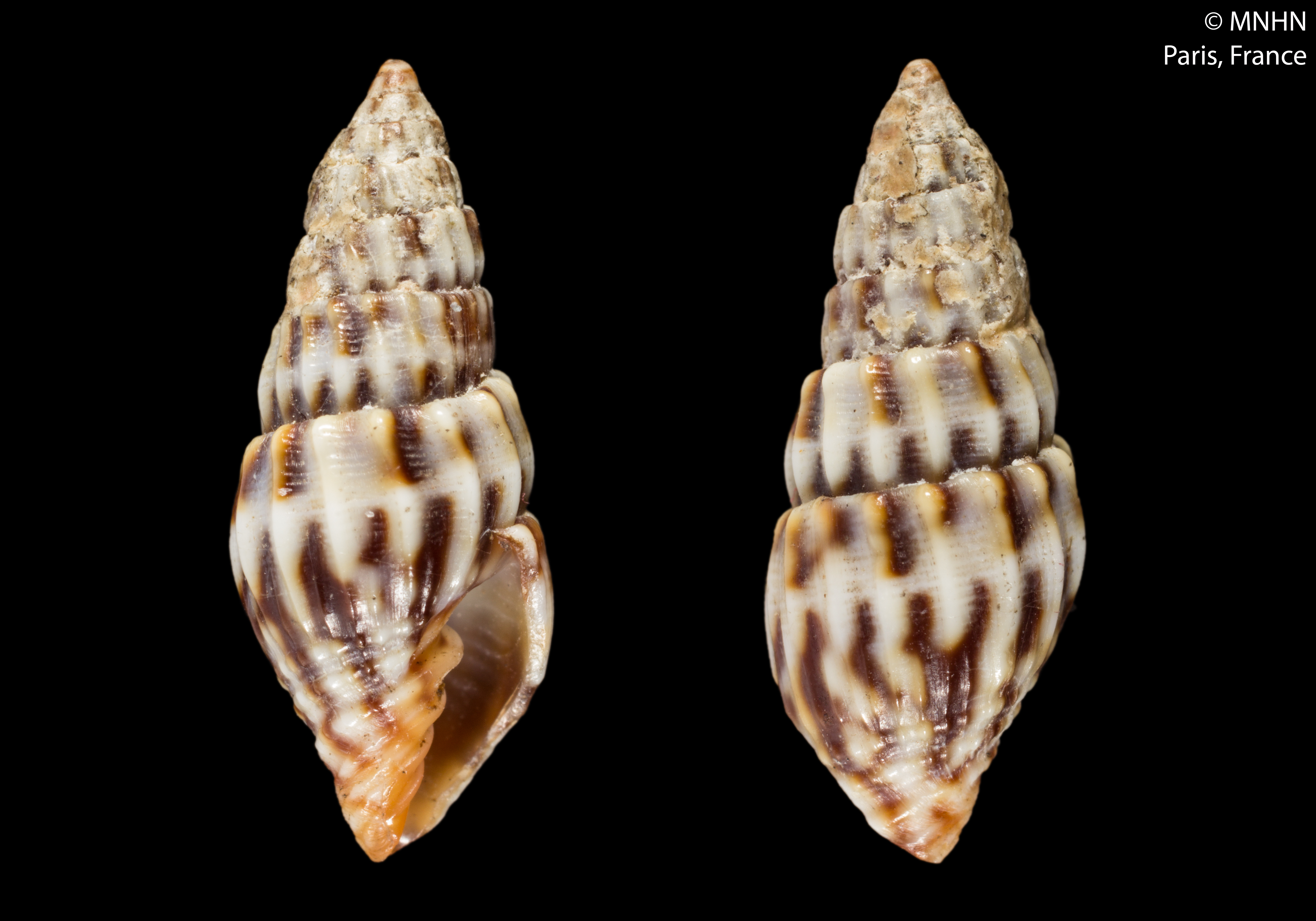
- Shell of Vexillum hervieri (syntype at MNHN, Paris)

Scientific classification
- Kingdom: Animalia
- Phylum: Mollusca
- Class: Gastropoda
- Subclass: Caenogastropoda
- Order: Neogastropoda
- Superfamily: Turbinelloidea
- Family: Costellariidae
- Genus: Vexillum
- Species: V. hervieri

Binomial name
- Vexillum hervieri (Dautzenberg & Bouge, 1923)

Synonyms
- Mitra (Pusia) hervieri Dautzenberg & Bouge, 1923 (basionym); Mitra (Pusia) hervieri var. decipiens Dautzenberg & Bouge, 1923; Pusia hervieri (P. Dautzenberg & J.L. Bouge, 1923); Vexillum (Pusia) hervieri (Dautzenberg & Bouge, 1923); Vexillum decipiens (. Dautzenberg & J.L. Bouge, 1923)

= Vexillum hervieri =

Species of gastropod

Vexillum hervieri is a species of small sea snail, marine gastropod mollusk in the family Costellariidae, the ribbed miters.

== Description ==
The length of the shell attains 15 mm.

== Distribution ==
This marine species occurs off New Caledonia, the Society Islands, and Tuamotu Islands.
