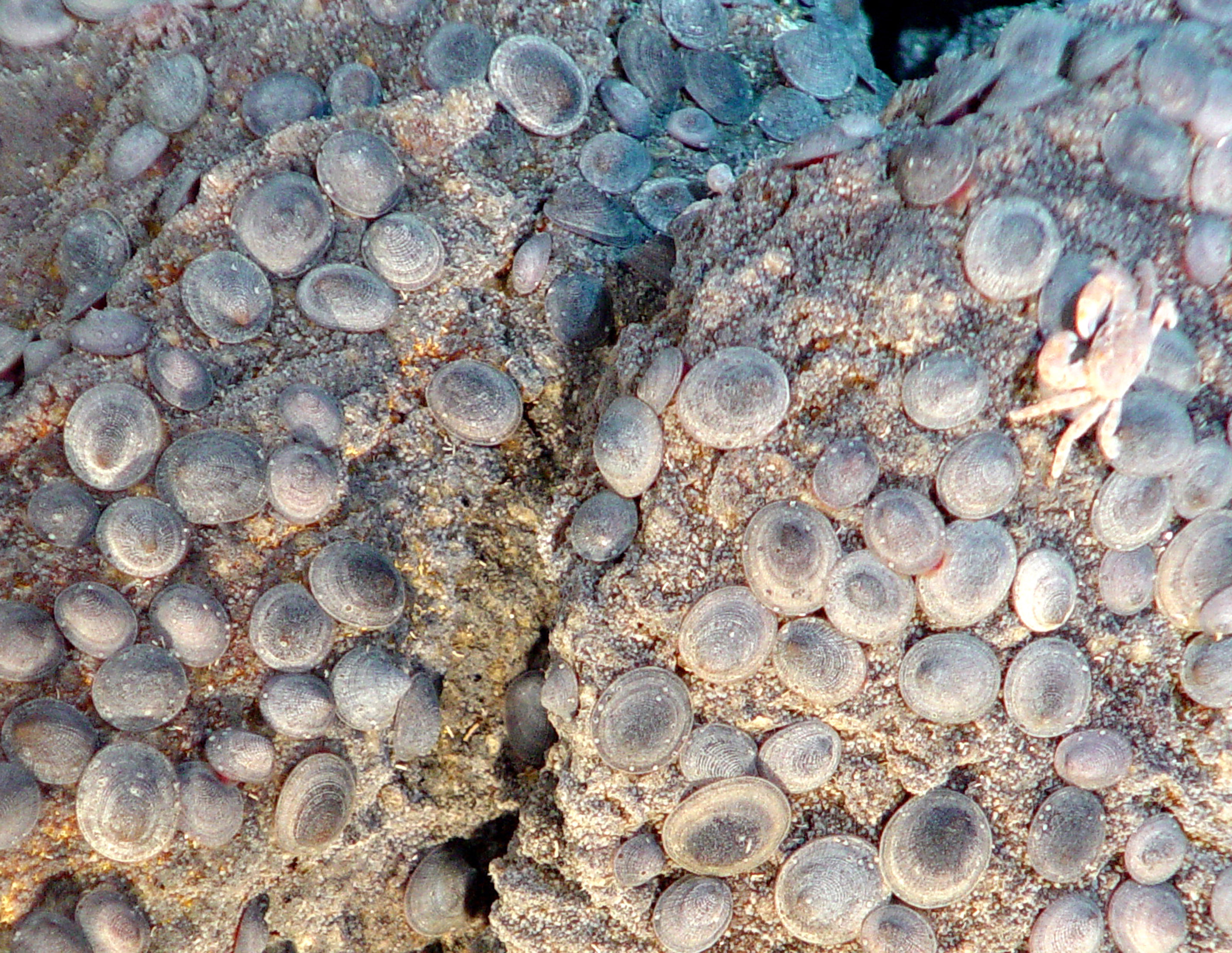
- A large number of adults and egg cases (white dots) of the hydrothermal vent species Shinkailepas kaikatensis with an arc crab on the right
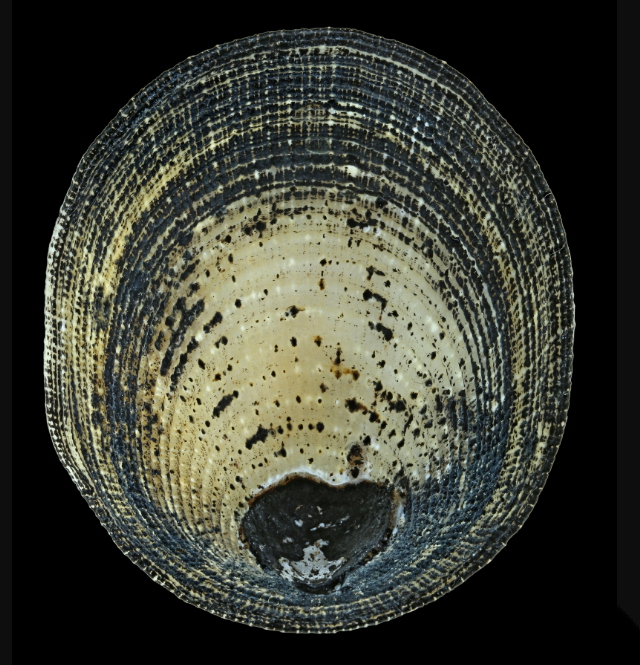
- Shell of Shinkailepas conspira (holotype at MNHN, Paris)

Scientific classification
- Kingdom: Animalia
- Phylum: Mollusca
- Class: Gastropoda
- Order: Cycloneritida
- Family: Phenacolepadidae
- Subfamily: Shinkailepadinae
- Genus: Shinkailepas; Okutani, Saito & Hashimoto, 1989

Synonyms
- Olgasolaris L. Beck, 1992

= Shinkailepas =

Genus of gastropods

Shinkailepas is a genus of sea snails or false limpets, marine gastropod molluscs in the family Phenacolepadidae.

== Species ==
Species within the genus Shinkailepas include:

- Shinkailepas conspira L. Beck, 2023
- Shinkailepas cornuthauma X.Y. Gu, C. Chen, K.X. Gao, Y.D. Zhou & J. Sun, 2025
- Shinkailepas gigas C. Chen, H. Watanabe & M. Tsuda, 2024
- Shinkailepas kaikatensis Okutani, Saito & Hashimoto, 1989
- Shinkailepas myojinensis Sasaki, Okutani & Fujikura, 2003
- Shinkailepas tiarasimia X.Y. Gu, C. Chen, K.X. Gao, Y.D. Zhou & J. Sun, 2025
- Shinkailepas tollmanni (L. Beck, 1992)
- Shinkailepas tufari L. Beck, 1992

Synonyms

- Shinkailepas briandi Warén & Bouchet, 2001: synonym of Divia briandi (Warén & Bouchet, 2001) (original combination)
