= Phenacolepas galathea =

Scientific classification
- Kingdom: Animalia
- Phylum: Mollusca
- Class: Gastropoda
- Order: Cycloneritida
- Family: Phenacolepadidae
- Genus: Phenacolepas
- Species: P. galathea

Binomial name
- Phenacolepas galathea (Lamarck)

Species of gastropod

Phenacolepas galathea is a species of sea snail, a marine gastropod mollusk in the family Phenacolepadidae.
