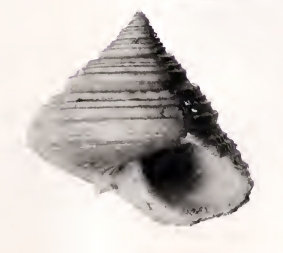
- Original drawing of a shell of Calliostoma leptophyma

Scientific classification
- Kingdom: Animalia
- Phylum: Mollusca
- Class: Gastropoda
- Subclass: Vetigastropoda
- Order: Trochida
- Family: Calliostomatidae
- Genus: Calliostoma
- Species: C. leptophyma

Binomial name
- Calliostoma leptophyma (Dautzenberg & H. Fischer, 1896)

Synonyms
- Zizyphinus laqueatus Locard 1896, Locard, 1898; Zizyphinus oppansus Locard 1896, Locard, 1898

= Calliostoma leptophyma =

Species of gastropod

Calliostoma leptophyma is a species of sea snail, a marine gastropod mollusk in the family Calliostomatidae.

== Distribution ==
This marine species occurs at bathyal depth off the Azores, North Africa and the Western Sahara
