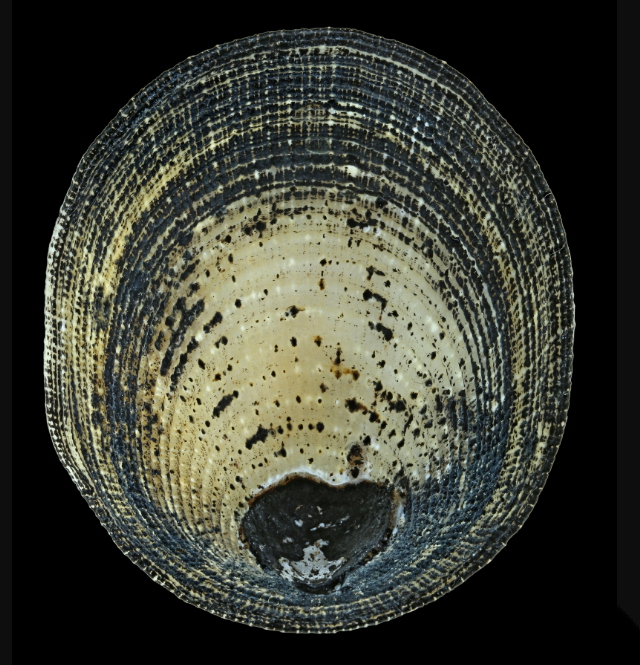
- Shinkailepas conspira

Scientific classification
- Kingdom: Animalia
- Phylum: Mollusca
- Class: Gastropoda
- Order: Cycloneritida
- Superfamily: Neritoidea
- Family: Phenacolepadidae
- Subfamily: Shinkailepadinae; Okutani, Saito & Hashimoto, 1989

Synonyms
- Shinkailepadidae Okutani, Saito & Hashimoto, 1989

= Shinkailepadinae =

Subfamily of gastropods

Shinkailepadinae is a subfamily of sea snails, marine gastropod mollusks in the superfamily Neritoidea.

== Genera ==
- Divia Fukumori, Yahagi, Warén & Kano, 2019
- Shinkailepas Okutani, Saito & Hashimoto, 1989
- Thalassonerita Moroni, 1966

Synonyms

- Bathynerita A. H. Clarke, 1989: synonym of Thalassonerita Moroni, 1966
- Olgasolaris L. Beck, 1992: synonym of Shinkailepas Okutani, Saito & Hashimoto, 1989
