= Phenacolepas fischeri =

Scientific classification
- Kingdom: Animalia
- Phylum: Mollusca
- Class: Gastropoda
- Order: Cycloneritida
- Family: Phenacolepadidae
- Genus: Phenacolepas
- Species: P. fischeri

Binomial name
- Phenacolepas fischeri (Rochebrune, 1881)

Species of gastropod

Phenacolepas fischeri is a species of sea snail, a marine sea gastropod mollusk in the family Phenacolepadidae.
