= Turbonilla hamonvillei =

Scientific classification
- Kingdom: Animalia
- Phylum: Mollusca
- Class: Gastropoda
- Family: Pyramidellidae
- Genus: Turbonilla
- Species: T. hamonvillei

Binomial name
- Turbonilla hamonvillei (Dautzenberg & Fischer H., 1896)

Species of gastropod

Turbonilla hamonvillei is a species of sea snail, a marine gastropod mollusk in the family Pyramidellidae, the pyrams and their allies.

== Description ==
The shell grows to a length of 9 mm.

== Distribution ==
This species occurs in the following locations:

- European waters (ERMS scope) : France
- Atlantic Ocean : the Azores.

== Notes ==
Additional information regarding this species:

- Habitat: Known from seamounts and knolls
