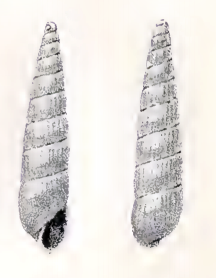
- Apertural and abapertural view of a shell of Turbonilla haullevillei

Scientific classification
- Kingdom: Animalia
- Phylum: Mollusca
- Class: Gastropoda
- Family: Pyramidellidae
- Genus: Turbonilla
- Species: T. haullevillei

Binomial name
- Turbonilla haullevillei Dautzenberg, 1912

Synonyms
- Turbonilla marteli Dautzenberg, 1912

= Turbonilla haullevillei =

Species of gastropod

Turbonilla haullevillei is a species of sea snail, a marine gastropod mollusk in the family Pyramidellidae, the pyrams and their allies.

== Distribution ==
This species occurs in the Atlantic Ocean off the estuary of the Congo River.
