= Shinkailepas myojinensis =

Scientific classification
- Kingdom: Animalia
- Phylum: Mollusca
- Class: Gastropoda
- Order: Cycloneritida
- Family: Phenacolepadidae
- Genus: Shinkailepas
- Species: S. myojinensis

Binomial name
- Shinkailepas myojinensis Sasaki, Okutani & Fujikura, 2003

Species of gastropod

Shinkailepas myojinensis is a species of sea snail, a marine gastropod mollusc in the family Phenacolepadidae. It is found in the Northwest Pacific inside hydrothermal vents. It survives by grazing on chemosynthetic bacterial mats while its larvae migrate to the surface to feed.
