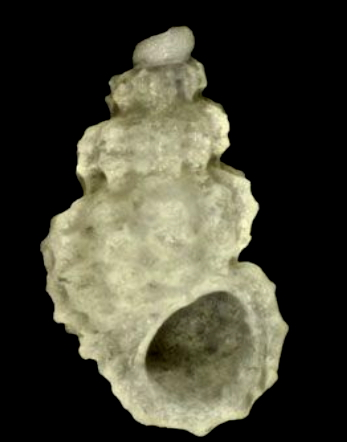
- Shell of Alvania platycephala (specimen at the Natural History Museum, Rotterdam)

Scientific classification
- Kingdom: Animalia
- Phylum: Mollusca
- Class: Gastropoda
- Subclass: Caenogastropoda
- Order: Littorinimorpha
- Superfamily: Rissooidea
- Family: Rissoidae
- Genus: Alvania
- Species: A. platycephala

Binomial name
- Alvania platycephala Dautzenberg & Fischer H., 1896

Synonyms
- Rissoa platycephala (Dautzenberg & H. Fischer, 1896); Rissoa platycephala var. exasperata Dautzenberg, 1927 ·

= Alvania platycephala =

Species of gastropod

Alvania platycephala is a species of small sea snail, a marine gastropod mollusk or micromollusk in the family Rissoidae.

== Description ==
The length of the shell attains 2.6–3 mm.

== Distribution ==
This species occurs in the Atlantic Ocean off the Azores and Madeira.
