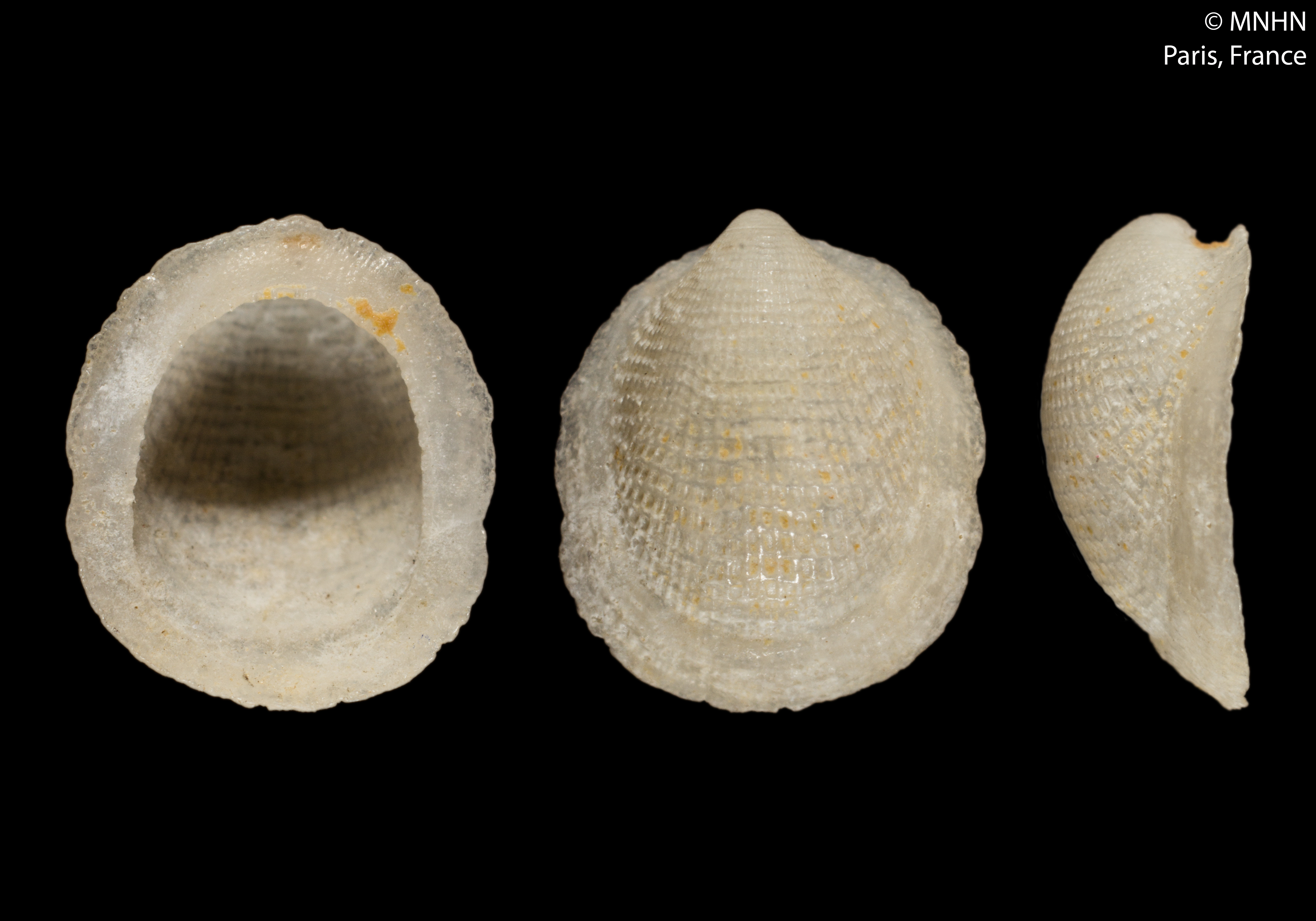
- Shell of Plesiothyreus cossmanni (lectotype at MNHN, Paris)

Scientific classification
- Kingdom: Animalia
- Phylum: Mollusca
- Class: Gastropoda
- Order: Cycloneritida
- Family: Phenacolepadidae
- Genus: Plesiothyreus; Cossmann, 1888

Type species
- † Capulus parmophoroides Cossmann, 1885

Synonyms
- Cinnalepeta Iredale, 1929; Phenacolepas Pilsbry, 1891; Pileopsis (Scutellina); Scutella Broderip, 1834 (Invalid: junior homonym of Scutella Lamarck, 1816 [Echinodermata]; Scutellina and Phenacolepas are replacement names); Scutellina Gray, 1847 (Invalid: junior homonym of Scutellina Agassiz, 1841 [Echinodermata]; Phenacolepas is a replacement name); Scutulina Cossmann, 1912

= Plesiothyreus =

Genus of gastropods

Plesiothyreus is a genus of very small sea snails or limpets, marine gastropod mollusks in the subfamily Phenacolepadinae of the family Phenacolepadidae.

== Species ==
Species within the genus Plesiothyreus include:

- Plesiothyreus aculeatus (Pease, 1868)
- Plesiothyreus arabicus (K.H.J. Thiele, 1909 ) (synonym: Phenacolepas arabica K.H.J. Thiele, 1909)
- Plesiothyreus brocki (Thiele, 1909)
- Plesiothyreus cancellatus (Pease, 1861)
- Plesiothyreus cinnamomeus (Gould, 1846)
- Plesiothyreus compressus (Pease, 1868)
- Plesiothyreus cosmanni Jousseaume, 1894
- Plesiothyreus cytherae (Lesson, 1831)
- Plesiothyreus elongatus (Thiele, 1909)
- Plesiothyreus evansi (Biggs, 1973)
- Plesiothyreus fischeri (Rochebrune, 1882)
- Plesiothyreus galathea (J.B.P.A. Lamarck, 1819) (synonym: Phenacolepas galathea (J.B.P.A. Lamarck, 1819)
- Plesiothyreus granocostatus (Pease, 1868)
- Plesiothyreus granulosus (Thiele, 1909)
- Plesiothyreus guttatus (Thiele, 1909)
- Plesiothyreus hamillei (P. Fischer, 1857)
- Plesiothyreus indicus (Thiele, 1909)
- Plesiothyreus malonei (Vanatta, 1912)
- Plesiothyreus newtoni G. B. Sowerby III, 1894
- Plesiothyreus omanensis (Biggs, 1973)
- Plesiothyreus pararabicus (Christiaens, 1988)
- † Plesiothyreus parmophoroides (Cossmann, 1885)
- Plesiothyreus peelae Christiaens, 1989
- † Plesiothyreus pliocenicus (Chirli, 2004)
- Plesiothyreus puntarenae (Mörch, 1860)
- Plesiothyreus radiatus (Schepman, 1908)
- Plesiothyreus reticulatus (Thiele, 1909)
- Plesiothyreus scobinatus (A. Gould, 1859)

Species brought into synonymy

- Plesiothyreus asperulatus (A. Adams, 1854): synonym of Phenacolepas galathea (Lamarck, 1819): synonym of Zacalantica galathea (Lamarck, 1819) (based on nomen nudum)
- Plesiothyreus cosmani Jousseaume, 1894: synonym of Plesiothyreus cossmanni Jousseaume, 1894 (incorrect original spelling)
- Plesiothyreus rushii (Dall, 1889): synonym of Hyalopatina rushii (Dall, 1889)
- Plesiothyreus gruveli (Dautzenberg, 1929) (uncertain > taxon inquirendum)
