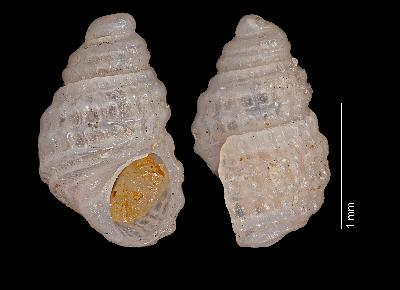
- Shell of Alvania boutani (syntype at MNHN, Paris)

Scientific classification
- Kingdom: Animalia
- Phylum: Mollusca
- Class: Gastropoda
- Subclass: Caenogastropoda
- Order: Littorinimorpha
- Superfamily: Rissooidea
- Family: Rissoidae
- Genus: Alvania
- Species: A. boutani

Binomial name
- Alvania boutani Dautzenberg & Fischer, 1907

= Alvania boutani =

Species of gastropod

Alvania boutani is a species of small sea snail, a marine gastropod mollusk or micromollusk in the family Rissoidae.

== Description ==
The length of the shell attains 1.9 mm, its diameter 1.2 mm.

(Original description in French) This very small shell is quite solid, shiny, imperforated and ovoid-conical in shape.

The spire is not very high. It is very obtuse at the top and is composed of 3 1/2 to 4 whorls separated by a well-marked suture. First (incomplete) whorl is smooth, the following are decorated with regularly and widely spaced longitudinal ribs and two decurrent funiculi a little stronger than the ribs, which with these determine a regular reticulations with quadrangular meshes slightly tubercular at the points of intersection. On the body whorl, four other decurrent funiculars are conspicuous between the periphery and the base. The longitudinal ribs fade below the periphery.

The rounded aperture is slightly angular at the top. The columella is arcuate. The columellar edge is provided with a thin, but clearly visible callosity. The outer lip is arched and shows, on the external side, tubercles corresponding to the ends of the decurrent funiculi.

The shell has a uniform subhyaline white color.

== Distribution ==
This marine species occurs off Vietnam.
