= Vexillum perrieri =

Scientific classification
- Kingdom: Animalia
- Phylum: Mollusca
- Class: Gastropoda
- Subclass: Caenogastropoda
- Order: Neogastropoda
- Superfamily: Turbinelloidea
- Family: Costellariidae
- Genus: Vexillum
- Species: V. perrieri

Binomial name
- Vexillum perrieri (Dautzenberg, 1929)

Synonyms
- Mitra (Turricula) perrieri Dautzenberg, 1929 (basionym); Mitra perrieri Dautzenberg, 1929; Mitra turricula A. Adams, 1853 (invalid: secondary junior homonym of Voluta turricula Gmelin, 1791); Vexillum (Costellaria) perrieri (Dautzenberg, 1929)

Species of gastropod

Vexillum perrieri is a species of marine sea snail in the family Costellariidae.

== Description ==
The length of the shell attains 15 mm, its diameter 4.9 mm.

== Distribution ==
This marine species occurs in shallow waters off Mozambique and Madagascar; the Maldives, Cocos-Keeling Islands, Fiji Islands, New Caledonia.
