= Tomb of Eve =

Archeological site in Jeddah, Saudi Arabia

Coordinates: 21°29′31″N 39°11′25″E

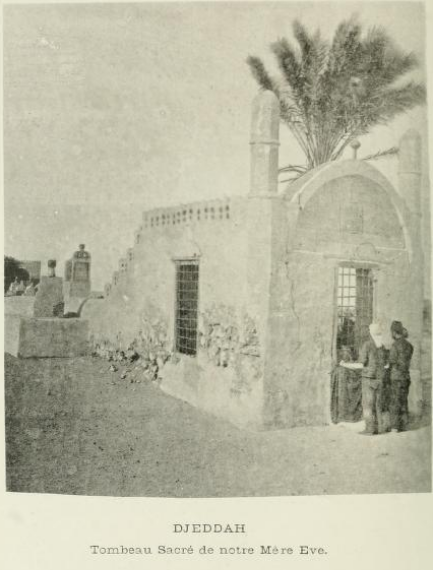
The tomb of Eve in 1894, during the Ottoman period

The Tomb of Eve, also known as Eve's Grave and Eve's Tomb, is an archaeological site located in Jeddah, Saudi Arabia. It is considered by some Muslims to be the burial place of Eve. Prince Faisal, Viceroy of Hejaz, destroyed it in 1928. In 1975, the site was also sealed with concrete by religious authorities, who disapprove of pilgrims praying at tombs.

Richard Francis Burton mentions seeing it in his translation of the Book of a Thousand Nights and a Night.

According to the Islamic religion, Eve is considered the grandmother of humanity ^{[Quran page 84, chapter 7:11–25]} ^{[Quran page 84, chapter 20:110–124]}, which influenced the name "Jeddah" meaning grandmother in Arabic.

== Mentions ==
Angelo Pesce mentions the site in his book on Jeddah and the earliest documented reference to the tomb:

In Hamdani (10th century) who states 'It has been related that Adam was in Mine when he felt a yearning to see Eve... that Eve had come from Juddah, and that he knew her on Arafat. The first one to speak of Eve's tomb as being in Jeddah is Idrisi (mid-12th century). However, Ibn Jubayr (late 12th century), writing from direct experience (unlike Idrisi, he went to Jeddah for the pilgrimage) state that in Jeddah 'is a place having an ancient and lofty dome, which is said to have been the lodging place of Eve . . . when on her way to Mecca... Ibn al-Mujawir (13th century) makes a clear reference to the Tomb of Eve in Jeddah, and so does Ibn Khallikan (13th century). Ibn Battutah (14th century) ignores the matter altogether. Historians like Tabari, Masudi, and others state that, according to tradition, Eve is buried in Jeddah, but fail to give any detail of her tomb.

British Acting Consul S. R. Jordan, writing in early 1926, describes the tomb as follows:

It may not be generally known that here is the Tomb of Eve, “ the mother of the world.” The grave is some 200 yards long and some 4 yards wide and has in the middle a small mosque, where formerly, on payment of a few piastres baksheish, the keeper of the edifice would lift a flagstone from the centre of the floor to allow sceptical Christians and pious Moslems an opportunity of admiring the lady’s navel. This tomb, until orders were issued to the contrary, used to be the favourite resort of childless wives and languishing maidens, but now has been closed under royal irade and anybody frequenting the place is punished.

== Dimensions ==
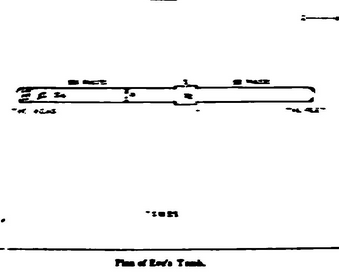
Plan of tomb of Eve by Sir Richard Francis Burton

Émile-Félix Gautier estimates the length of the tomb as about 130 m.

The publicist Sirdar Ikbal Ali Shah mentions about the dimensions:

Eve must have been a lady of formidable proportions, for the original grave, I was told, was some eight feet long. It was as well, therefore, that she had not survived to welcome us in the flesh, for although it is rumored that we Muslims have an eye for ladies of heroic proportion we draw the line at the titanic. But I was told that the grave had mysteriously extended itself by the time I arrived to its present gigantic proportions.

Aun Ar-Rafiq (Amir in Hijaz 1882–1905) tried to demolish the tomb, but that caused a public outcry. He then said: "But think you that 'our mother' was so tall? If the stupidity is international, let the tomb stand". However, this is not really surprising as a Hadith 3326 from Sahih al-Bukhari (known as the most authentic collection of hadith) narrated by Abu Hurairah states that Adam was created 60 cubits tall (about 30 meters), and that people in Paradise will look like Adam.

== Gallery ==
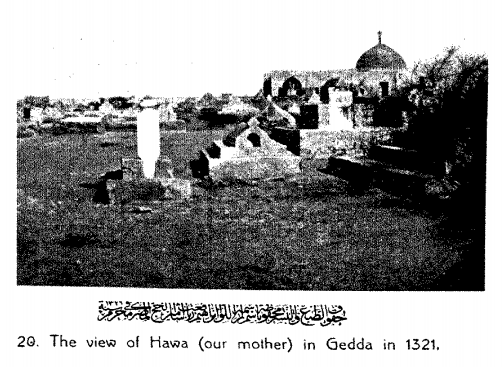
The tomb of Eve in 1903

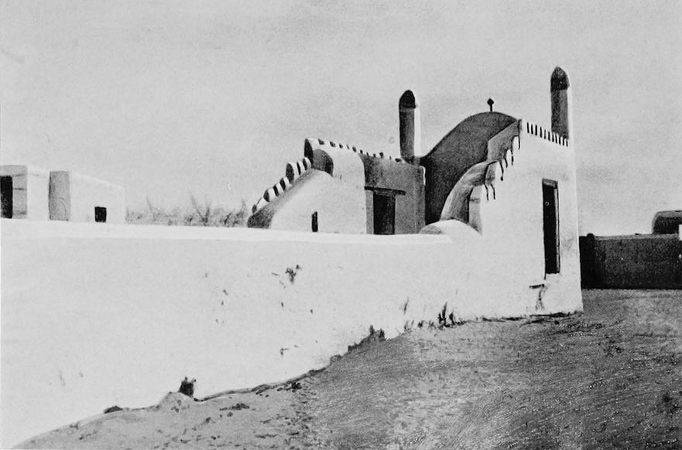
The tomb of Eve in 1913

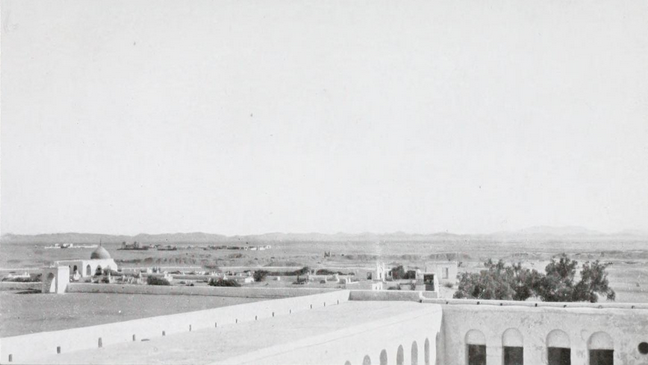
The tomb of Eve in 1922

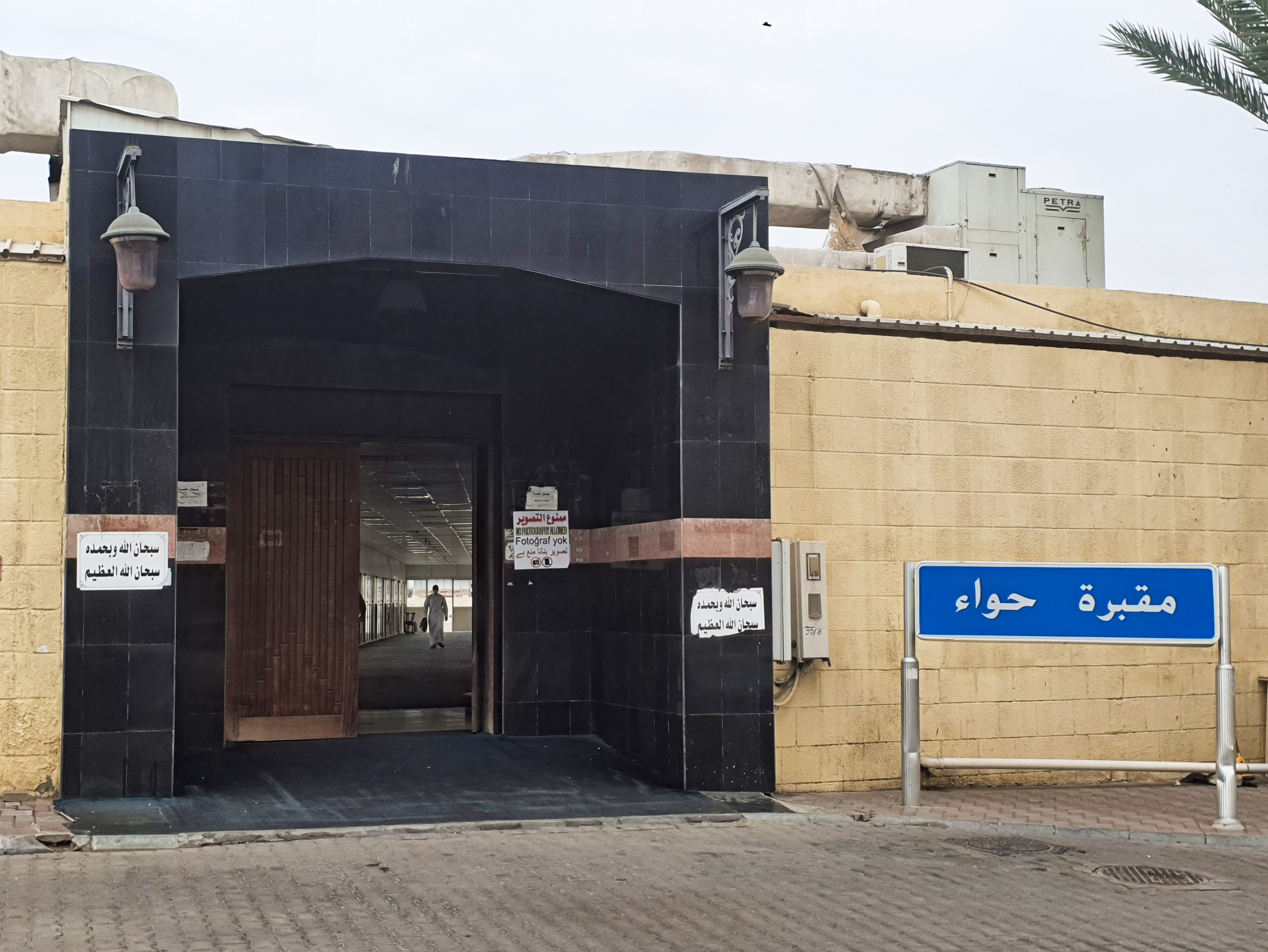
Cemetery of Eve, Jeddah, Saudi Arabia, in 2020
