= Zacalantica galathea =

Scientific classification
- Kingdom: Animalia
- Phylum: Mollusca
- Class: Gastropoda
- Order: Cycloneritida
- Family: Phenacolepadidae
- Genus: Zacalantica
- Species: Z. galathea

Binomial name
- Zacalantica galathea (Lamarck, 1819)

Synonyms
- Patella galathea Lamarck, 1819 (original combination); Phenacolepas asperulata (A. Adams, 1854) (based on nomen nudum); Phenacolepas galathea (Lamarck, 1819); Plesiothyreus asperulatus (A. Adams, 1854) (based on nomen nudum); Scutellina asperulata A. Adams, 1854 (nomen nudum); Scutellina squamosa Garrett, 1877 (uncertain synonym)

Species of gastropod

Zacalantica galathea is a species of sea snail, a marine gastropod mollusk in the family Phenacolepadidae.

== Description ==
The length of the shell attains 10.9 mm.

== Distribution ==
This marine species occurs off Tanzania, Mauritius, the Comoros, and Fiji Islands.
