= Hyalopatina =

Scientific classification
- Kingdom: Animalia
- Phylum: Mollusca
- Class: Gastropoda
- Order: Cycloneritida
- Superfamily: Neritoidea
- Family: Phenacolepadidae
- Genus: Hyalopatina; Hyalopatina

Type species
- Umbraculum (Hyalopatina) rushii Dall, 1889

Synonyms
- Umbraculum (Hyalopatina) Dall, 1889 (original rank)

Genus of gastropods

Hyalopatina is a genus of very small sea snails or limpets, marine gastropod mollusks in the subfamily Phenacolepadinae of the family Phenacolepadidae.

== Species ==
- Hyalopatina nakamigawai (Is. Taki, 1954)
- Hyalopatina planata (Habe, 1951)
- Hyalopatina rushii (Dall, 1889)
