= Labeobarbus gruveli =

Conservation status
- Vulnerable (IUCN 3.1)

Scientific classification
- Kingdom: Animalia
- Phylum: Chordata
- Class: Actinopterygii
- Order: Cypriniformes
- Family: Cyprinidae
- Subfamily: Torinae
- Genus: Labeobarbus
- Species: L. gruveli

Binomial name
- Labeobarbus gruveli (Pellegrin, 1911)

Synonyms
- Barbus gruveliPellegrin, 1911

Species of fish

Labeobarbus gruveli is a species of ray-finned fish in the genus Labeobarbus which is known only from the Dubreka River in Guinea.

== Etymology ==
The fish is named in honor of French biologist Jean Abel Gruvel (1870–1941), who collected a holotype specimen.
