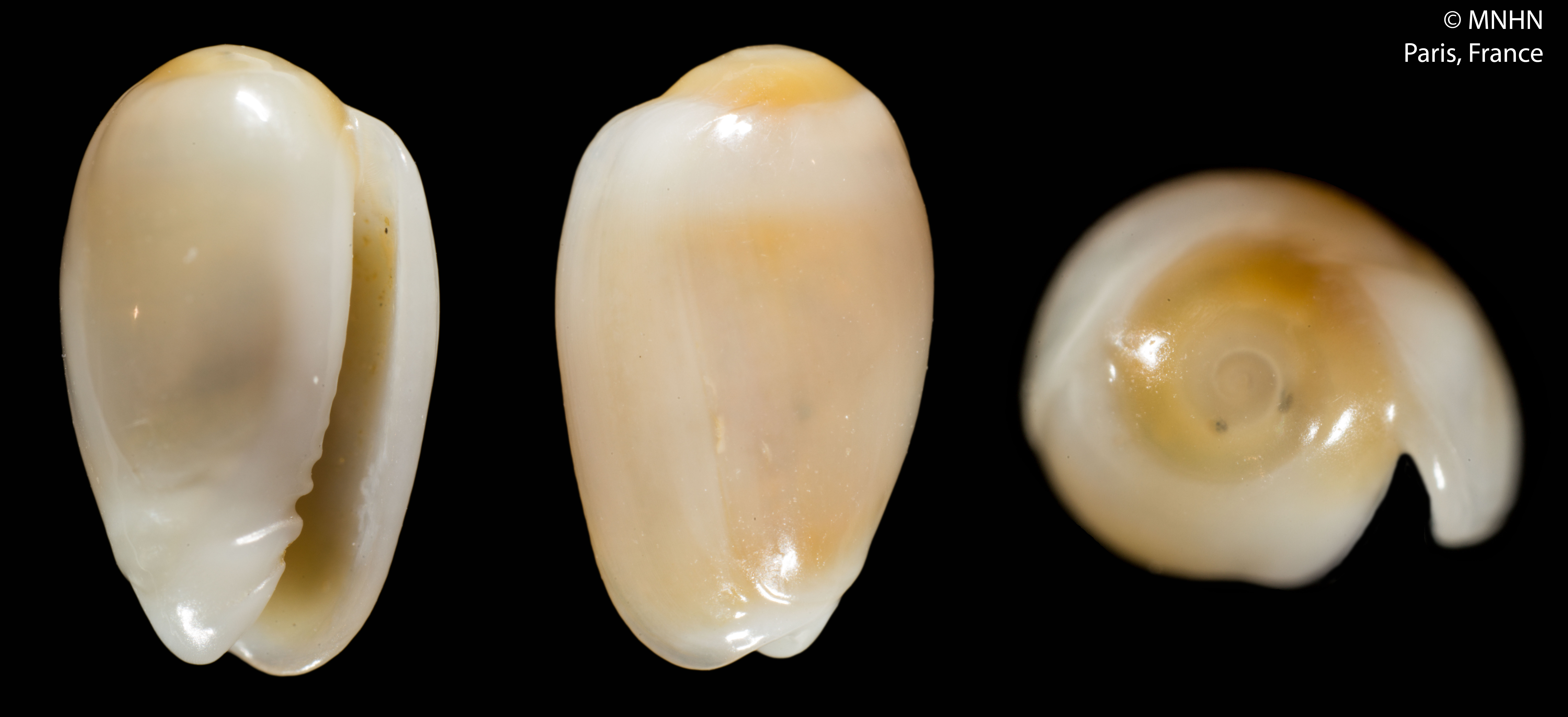
- Shell of Gibberula gruveli (lectotype at MNHN, Paris)

Scientific classification
- Kingdom: Animalia
- Phylum: Mollusca
- Class: Gastropoda
- Subclass: Caenogastropoda
- Order: Neogastropoda
- Family: Cystiscidae
- Subfamily: Cystiscinae
- Genus: Gibberula
- Species: G. gruveli

Binomial name
- Gibberula gruveli Bavay, 1913

Synonyms
- Marginella gruveli Bavay in Dautzenberg, 1912 (original combination)

= Gibberula gruveli =

Species of sea snail

Gibberula gruveli is a species of very small sea snail, a marine gastropod mollusk or micromollusk in the family Cystiscidae.

== Distribution ==
This marine species occurs off Namibia.

== Etymology ==
The snail is named after Jean Abel Gruvel.
