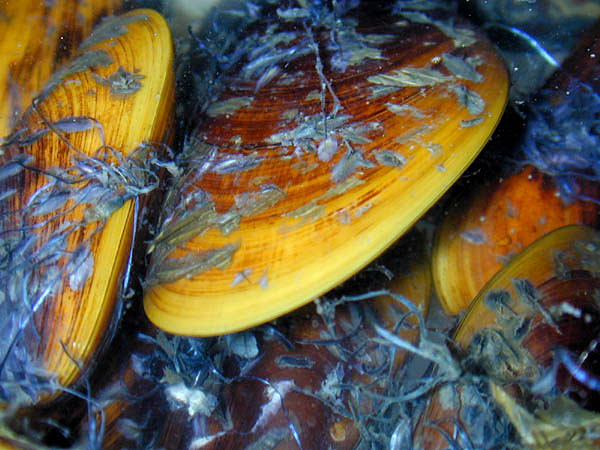

Scientific classification
- Kingdom: Animalia
- Phylum: Mollusca
- Class: Bivalvia
- Order: Mytilida
- Family: Modiolidae
- Genus: Bathymodiolus
- Species: B. childressi

Binomial name
- Bathymodiolus childressi Gustafson, Turner, Lutz, & Vrijenhoek, 1998

= Bathymodiolus childressi =

Species of bivalve

Bathymodiolus childressi is a species of deepwater mussel, a marine bivalve mollusk species in the family Mytilidae, the mussels.

Although this species has been known since 1985, it was formally described as a species in 1998.

== Habitat ==
This species lives in cold seeps in the Gulf of Mexico.

Bathymodiolus childressi is stenothermal species living in temperatures ranging from 6.5 to 7.2 °C. However it was able to survive the temperature of 20 °C in the laboratory.

== Symbiosis ==
This mussel harbors intracellular methanotrophic bacteria in its gills. The bacteria provide carbon to the mussel.

== Interspecific relationships ==
The snail Bathynerita naticoidea can detect beds of the mussel Bathymodiolus childressi. It is attracted to water that has been altered by this species of mussel, but the nature of the attractant was not discovered yet. This snail also feeds on periphyton of methanotrophic bacteria that grow on the shells of Bathymodiolus childressi, living on the decomposing periostracum of the mussels and on byssal fibres of those mussels.

== Etymology ==
This species was named after James J. Childress, a marine biologist who investigated the physiology of this mussel at the University of California, Santa Barbara.
