= Phenacolepas =

Scientific classification
- Kingdom: Animalia
- Phylum: Mollusca
- Class: Gastropoda
- Order: Cycloneritida
- Family: Phenacolepadidae
- Genus: Phenacolepas; Pilsbry, 1891

Genus of gastropods

Phenacolepas is a genus of small sea snails that have a limpet-like or patelliform shell. These are marine gastropod mollusks in the family Phenacolepadidae.

== Species ==
Species within the genus Phenacolepas include:

- Phenacolepas arabica
- Phenacolepas asperulata A. Adams, 1858
- Phenacolepas calva
- Phenacolepas cinnamomea
- Phenacolepas crenulata
- Phenacolepas fischeri (Rochebrune, 1881)
- Phenacolepas galathea (Lamarck)
- Phenacolepas immeritus
- Phenacolepas malonei
- Phenacolepas mirabilis
- Phenacolepas nobilis
- Phenacolepas omanensis
- Phenacolepas osculans
- Phenacolepas tenuisculpta
