= René Chudeau =

French geologist (1864–1921)

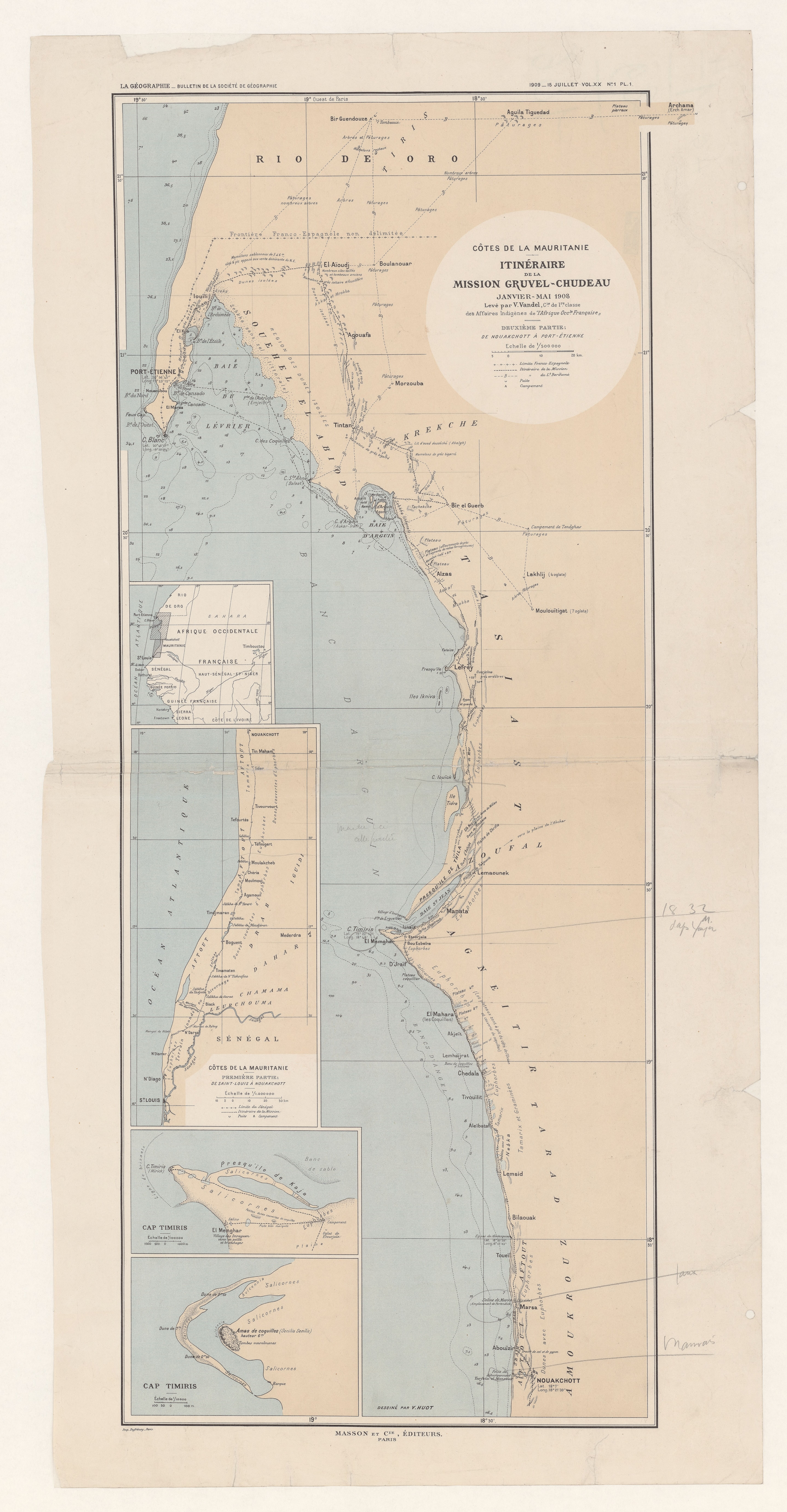
Coasts of Mauritania map drawn by Victor Huot from survey by V. Vandel (Itinerary of the Jean Abel Gruvel - René Chudeau mission, January-May 1908)

René Chudeau (21 August 1864, in Angers – 1921) was a French geologist.

Formerly an instructor at the University of Besançon, from 1905 to 1914 he conducted a series of geological surveys in the Sahara (later day nations of Mali, Mauritania and Niger). His interests included Quaternary deposits, the formation of sand dunes, processes of aeolian erosion, et al. In the Taoudeni basin, he investigated ancient volcanoes, and south of Agadez, he found the presence of dinosaur bones. In the Zinder region, he made a discovery of Lower Cretaceous rocks being overlain by Upper Cretaceous successions. His geological collections are housed at the Muséum national d'histoire naturelle in Paris.

The botanical species Pennisetum chudeaui Trab. Maire is named in his honor.

== Selected writings ==
- Contribution a l'étude géologique de la Vieille-Castille, 1896 – Contribution to the study of geology in Vieille-Castille.
- Missions au Sahara Volume 1, 1908–09 (with Émile Félix Gautier). Missions of the Sahara.
- Sahara Soudanais, 1909 – Sudanese Sahara.
- A travers la Mauritanie Occidentale : de Saint-Louis a Port-Etienne, two volumes 1909, 1911 (with Jean Abel Gruvel) – Through western Mauritania : Saint-Louis – Port-Etienne.
- Note sur l'ethnographie de la région du Moyen Niger, 1910 – Note involving ethnography from the mid-Niger region.
- Rapport de Mission en Mauritanie 1910–1911, 1913 – Report on a mission to Mauritania.
- Le bassin du moyen Niger, 1912 – The drainage basin of the middle Niger.
