= Hyalopatina rushii =

Scientific classification
- Kingdom: Animalia
- Phylum: Mollusca
- Class: Gastropoda
- Order: Cycloneritida
- Family: Phenacolepadidae
- Genus: Hyalopatina
- Species: H. rushii

Binomial name
- Hyalopatina rushii (Dall, 1889)

Synonyms
- Plesiothyreus rushii (Dall, 1889); Umbraculum rushii Dall, 1889 (original combination)

Species of gastropod

Hyalopatina rushii is a species of very small sea snail, a limpet, a marine gastropod mollusc in the family Phenacolepadidae.

== Distribution ==
This species occurs in the Gulf of Mexico, the Caribbean Sea and off the Lesser Antilles.
