= Zacalantica =

Scientific classification
- Kingdom: Animalia
- Phylum: Mollusca
- Class: Gastropoda
- Order: Cycloneritida
- Superfamily: Neritoidea
- Family: Phenacolepadidae
- Genus: Zacalantica; Iredale, 1929

Type species
- Phenacolepas linguaviverrae Melvill & Standen, 1899

Synonyms
- Amapileus Iredale, 1929; Plesiothyreus (Amapileus) Iredale, 1929; Septaria (Paraseptaria) Risbec, 1942

Genus of gastropods

Zacalantica is a genus of very small sea snails or limpets, marine gastropod mollusks in the subfamily Phenacolepadinae of the family Phenacolepadidae.

== Species ==
- Zacalantica galathea (Lamarck, 1819)
- Zacalantica laevicostalis (Thiele, 1909)
- Zacalantica linguaviverrae (Melvill & Standen, 1899)
- Zacalantica sagittifer (A. Gould, 1852)
- Zacalantica senta (Hedley, 1899)
- Zacalantica tenuisculpta (Thiele, 1909)
- Zacalantica unguiformis (A. Gould, 1859)

Synonyms

- Zacalantica scobinata (A. Gould, 1859): synonym of Plesiothyreus scobinatus (A. Gould, 1859)
