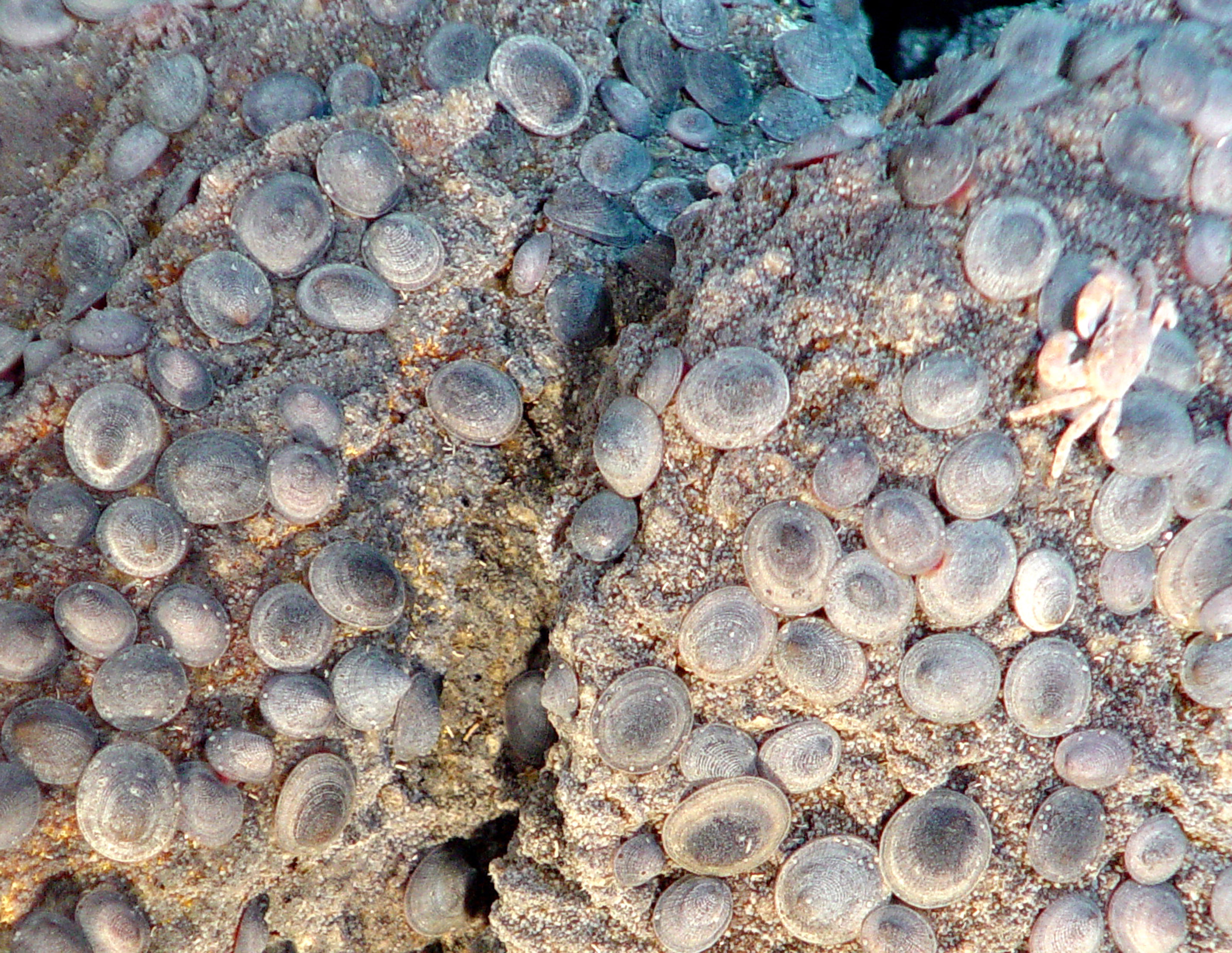
- A large number of adults (2 cm, 0.75 in) and egg cases (white dots) of the hydrothermal vent species Shinkailepas kaikatensis (and an arc crab on the right), April 2004

Scientific classification
- Kingdom: Animalia
- Phylum: Mollusca
- Class: Gastropoda
- Order: Cycloneritida
- Family: Phenacolepadidae
- Genus: Shinkailepas
- Species: S. kaikatensis

Binomial name
- Shinkailepas kaikatensis Okutani, Saito & Hashimoto, 1989

= Shinkailepas kaikatensis =

Species of gastropod

Shinkailepas kaikatensis is a species of sea snail, a false limpet, a marine gastropod mollusc in the family Phenacolepadidae.

It was first described by Okutani, Saito and Hashimoto in 1989.

== Description ==
The individuals in the NOAA image are adults of 2 cm (0.75 in) living on rock surfaces at a hydrothermal vent at the East Diamante seamount, which is west-southwest of the small island of Farallon de Medinilla in the Southern Seamount Province of the Mariana Islands. The hydrothermal vent at East Diamante is "shallower than 200 m (650 ft)" according to the NOAA description. The white dots on the rocks and on the limpet shells in this image are the egg capsules of the species.
