= Sensory organs of gastropods =

The sensory organs of gastropods (snails and slugs) include olfactory organs, eyes, statocysts and mechanoreceptors. Gastropods have no sense of hearing.

== Olfactory organs ==
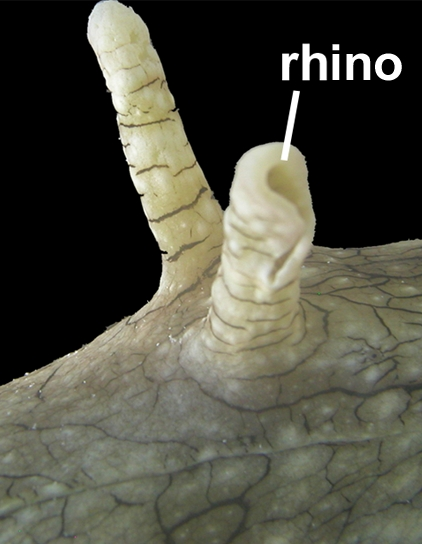
Rhinophores of Aplysia californica.

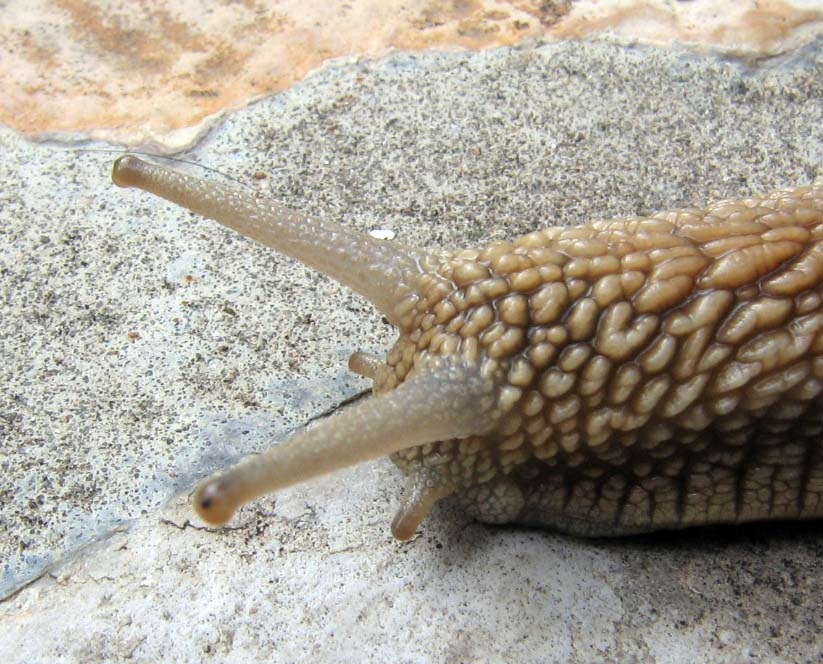
The upper pair of tentacles on the head of the edible snail Helix pomatia have eyes, but the main sensory organs are sensory neurons for olfaction in the epithelium of the tentacles.

In terrestrial gastropods the most important sensory organs are the olfactory organs which are located on the tips of the 4 tentacles. Some terrestrial gastropods can track the odor of food using their tentacles (tropotaxis) and the wind (anemotaxis).

In opisthobranch marine gastropods, the chemosensory organs are two protruding structures on top of the head. These are known as rhinophores. An opisthobranch sea slug Navanax inermis has chemoreceptors on the sides of its mouth to track mucopolysaccharides in the slime trails of prey, and of potential mates.

The freshwater snail Bithynia tentaculata is capable of detecting the presence of molluscivorous (mollusk-eating) leeches through chemoreception, and of closing its operculum to avoid predation.

The deepwater snail Bathynerita naticoidea can detect mussel beds containing the mussel Bathymodiolus childressi, because it is attracted to water that has cues in it from this species of mussel.

== Eyes ==
In terrestrial pulmonate gastropods, eye spots are present at the tips of the tentacles in the Stylommatophora or at the base of the tentacles in the Basommatophora. These eye spots range from simple ocelli that cannot project an image (simply distinguishing light and dark), to more complex pit and even lens eyes. Vision is not the most important requirement in terrestrial gastropods, because they are mainly nocturnal animals.

Some gastropods, for example the freshwater apple snails (family Ampullariidae) and marine species of genus Strombus can completely regenerate their eyes. The gastropods in both of these families have lens eyes.

Morphological sequence of different types of multicellular eyes exemplified by gastropod eyes:

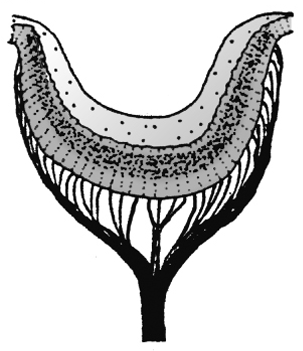
Eye pit of Patella sp.

Scheme of pit eye.

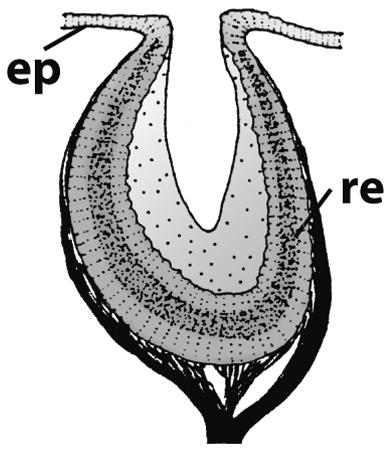
Eye cup of Pleurotomaria sp.

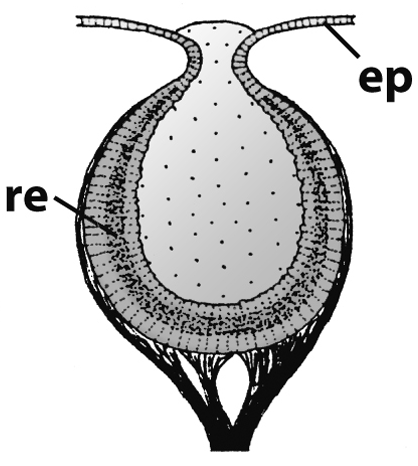
Pinhole eye of Haliotis sp.

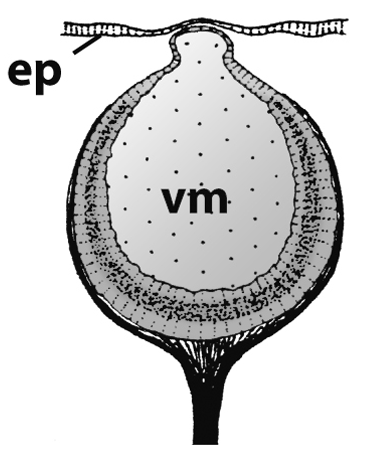
Closed eye of Turbo coronatus.

=== Lens eyes ===
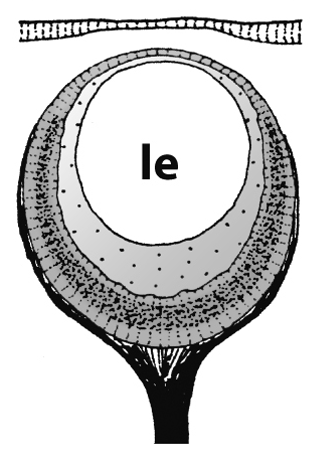
Lens eye of Bolinus brandaris.

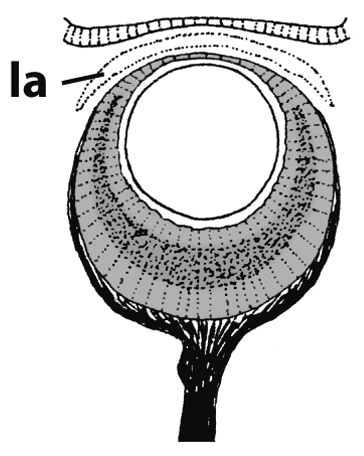
Lens eye of Nucella lapillus.

Scheme of lens eye.

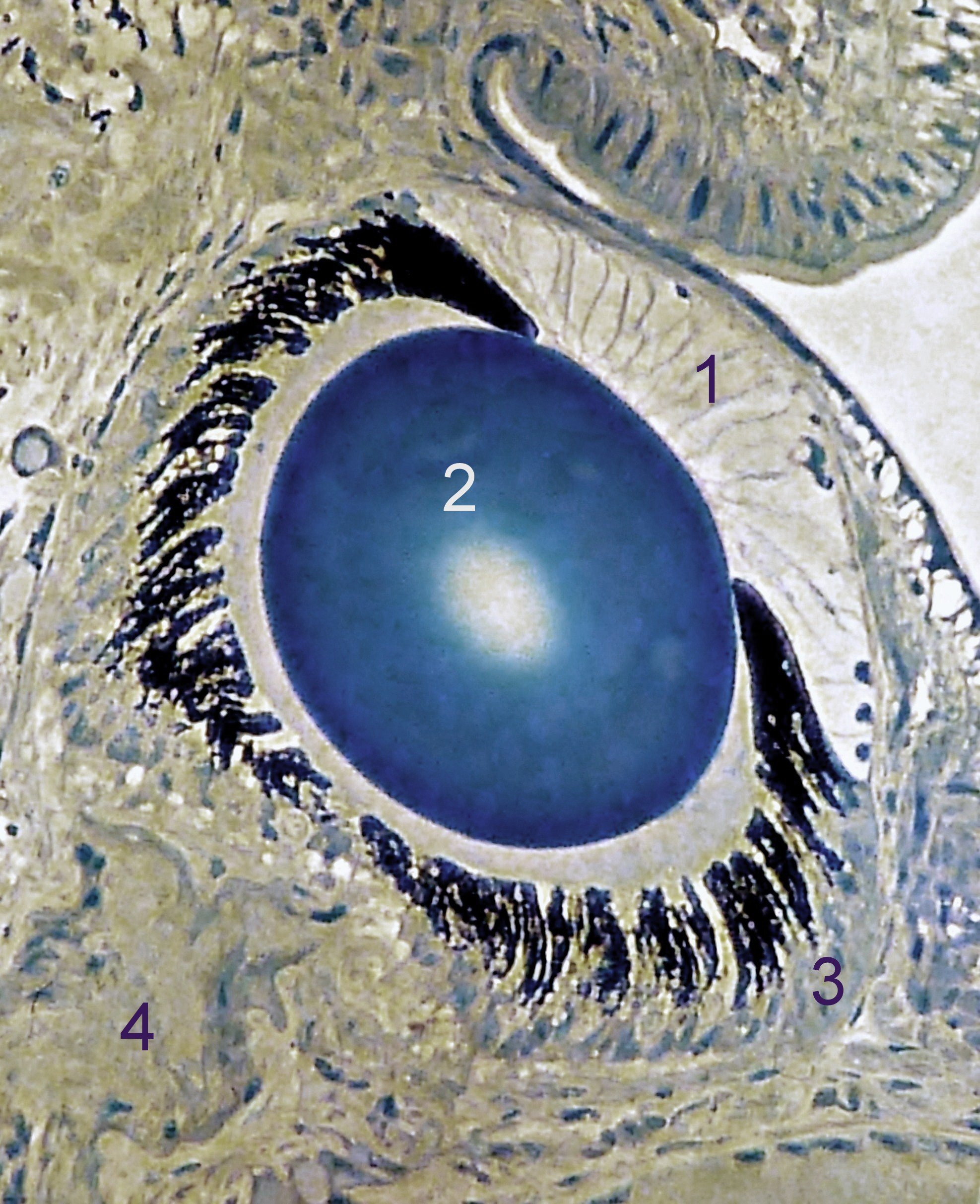
Eye of a snail. 1 - anterior chamber, 2 - lens, 3 - retina, 4 - optic nerve.

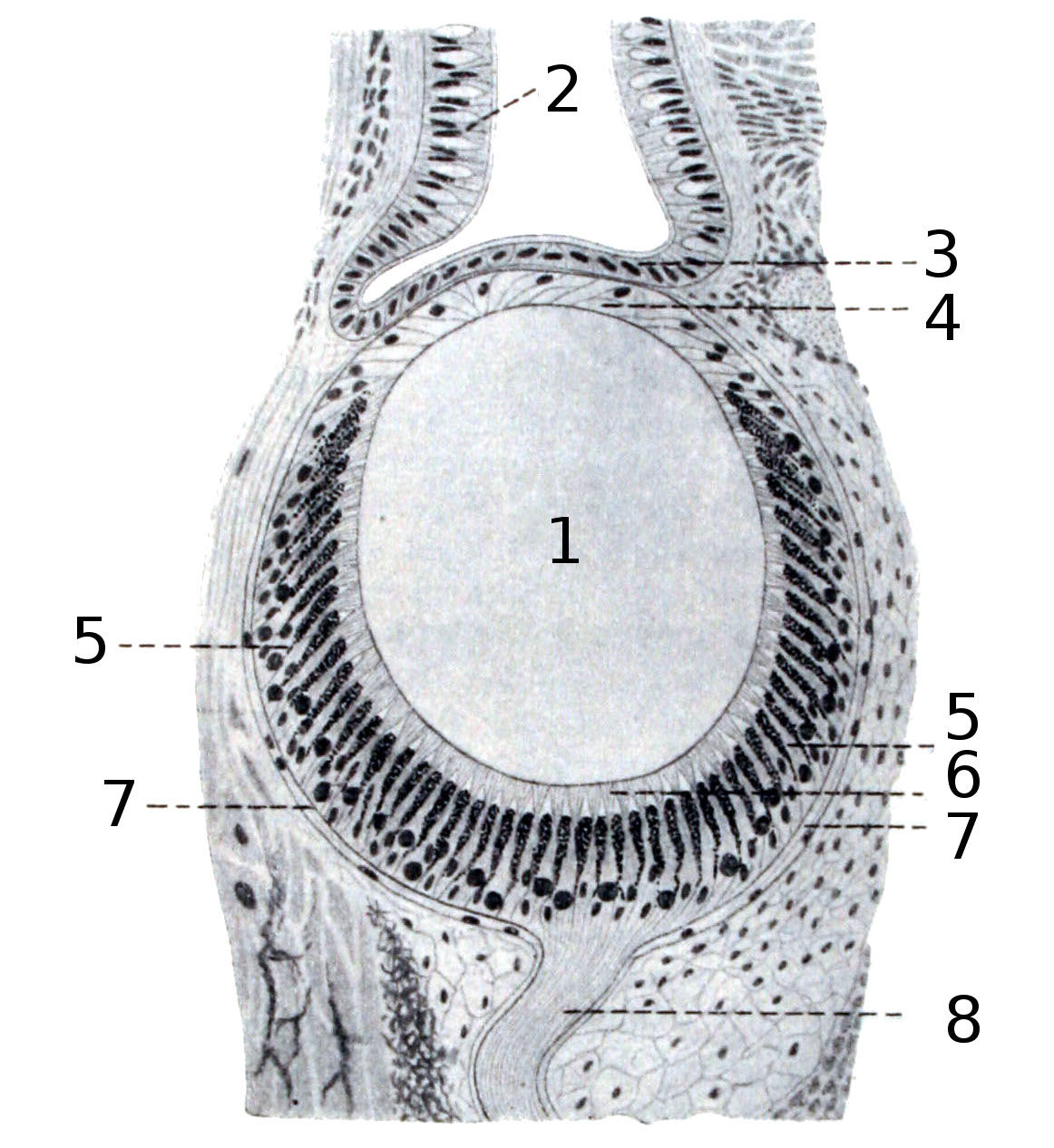
Drawing of cross section of the eye of Helix pomatia. 1 - lens 2 - olfactory epithelium 3 - corneal epithelium 4 - corneal endothelium 5 - retina 6 - layer with rod cells 7 - fibrous connective tissue layer 8 - nerve of the eye

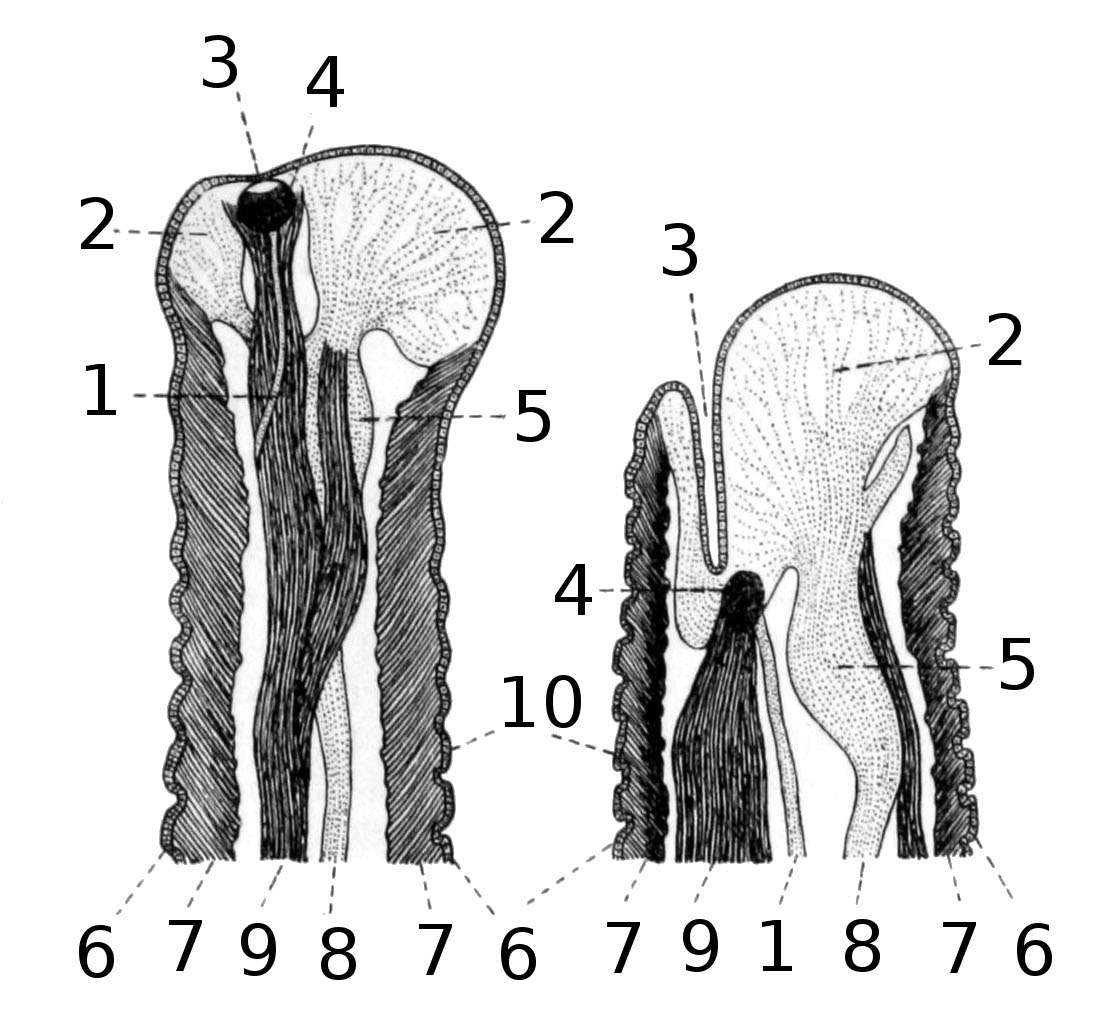
Drawing of cross sections of the extracted tentacle (left) and constricted tentacle (right) with and eye of Helix pomatia. 1 - nerve of an eye 2 - 3 - 4 - eye 5 - tentacle ganglion 6 - epidermis 7 - 8 - nerve of an tentacle 9 - retractor muscle 10 -

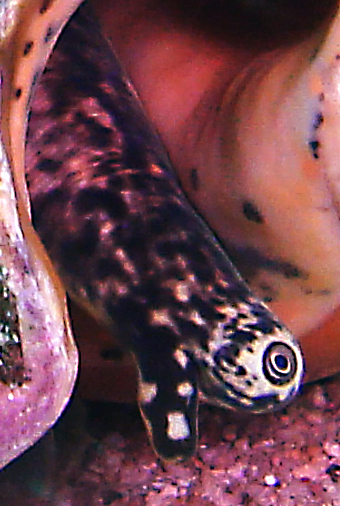
Well-developed lens eye of Eustrombus gigas on eyestalk has a black iris. There is a small tentacle on the eyestalk also.

another drawing of eye of Helix pomatia

== Statocysts ==
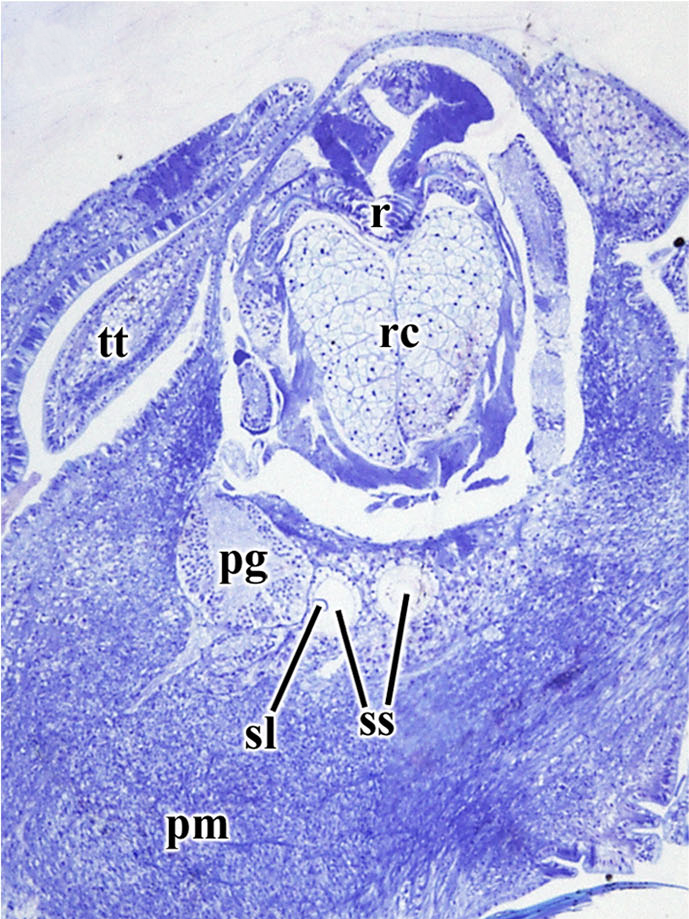
Statocysts (ss) and statolith (sl) inside the head of Gigantopelta chessoia.

In the statocysts of Haliotis asinina was found the expression of a conserved gene (Pax-258 gene), which is also important for forming structures for balance in eumetazoans.

Statocysts are organs involved in balance and orientation relative to gravity. The consist of fluid filled chambers containing dense mineral bodies, either a single statolith or multiple smaller statoconia. Gravity causes these bodies to load the cilia of sensory cells lining the chamber, stimulating receptors that provide information about the animal's orientation.

== Mechanoreceptors ==
The mechanoreceptors are very crucial to the snail's sensory.

== See also ==
- Hancock's organ
- Sensory ecology
- Sensory systems in fish
