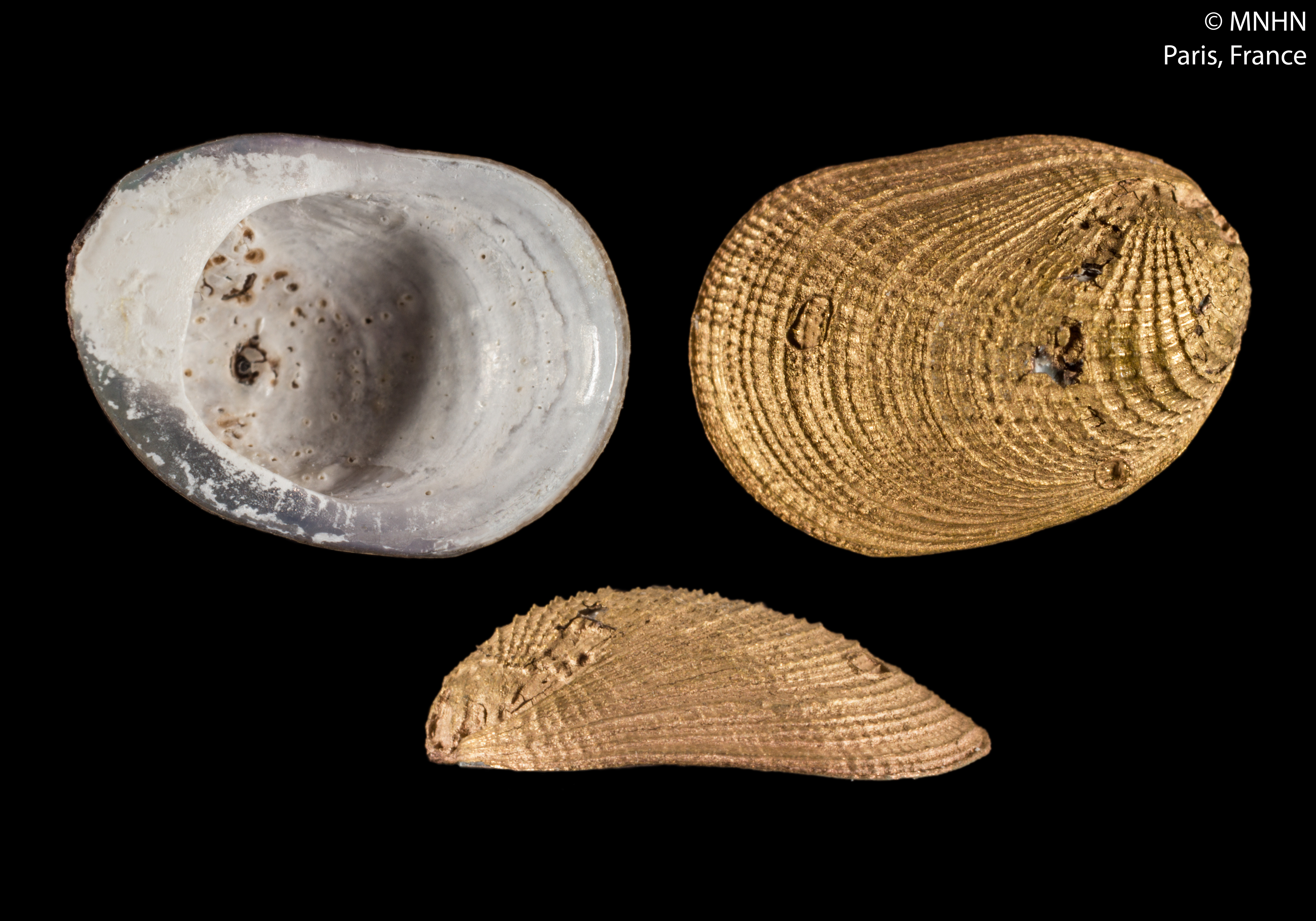
- Divia briandi

Scientific classification
- Kingdom: Animalia
- Phylum: Mollusca
- Class: Gastropoda
- Order: Cycloneritida
- Family: Phenacolepadidae
- Subfamily: Shinkailepadinae
- Genus: Divia; Fukumori, Yahagi, Warén & Kano, 2019
- Species: D. briandi

Binomial name
- Divia briandi (Warén & Bouchet, 2001)

Synonyms
- Shinkailepas briandi Warén & Bouchet, 2001

= Divia briandi =

Species of gastropod

Divia briandi is a species of sea snail, a marine gastropod mollusc in the family Phenacolepadidae. It is the only species in the genus Divia.

== Distribution ==
The type locality of Divia briandi is Mid-Atlantic Ridge: 37°50.54'N, 31°30.30'W in depth 860–870 m.

== Description ==
The maximum recorded shell length is 10 mm.

== Habitat ==
Minimum recorded depth is 850 m. Maximum recorded depth is 3520 m.
