= Thalassonerita =

Thalassonerita Temporal range: Early Miocene-Recent

Scientific classification
- Kingdom: Animalia
- Phylum: Mollusca
- Class: Gastropoda
- Order: Cycloneritida
- Family: Phenacolepadidae
- Genus: Thalassonerita; Moroni, 1966
- Species: T. naticoidea

Binomial name
- Thalassonerita naticoidea (A. H. Clarke, 1989)

Synonyms
- Bathynerita A. H. Clarke, 1989; Nerita (Thalassonerita) Moroni, 1966

Genus of gastropods

Thalassonerita is a monotypic genus of sea snails, marine gastropod mollusks in the family Neritidae. Its sole species is Thalassonerita naticoidea. T. naticoidea is endemic to underwater cold seeps in the northern Gulf of Mexico and in the Caribbean. Originally classified as Bathynerita, the genus was reassessed in 2019 after Thalassonerita was found to be a senior synonym of Bathynerita.

== Distribution ==
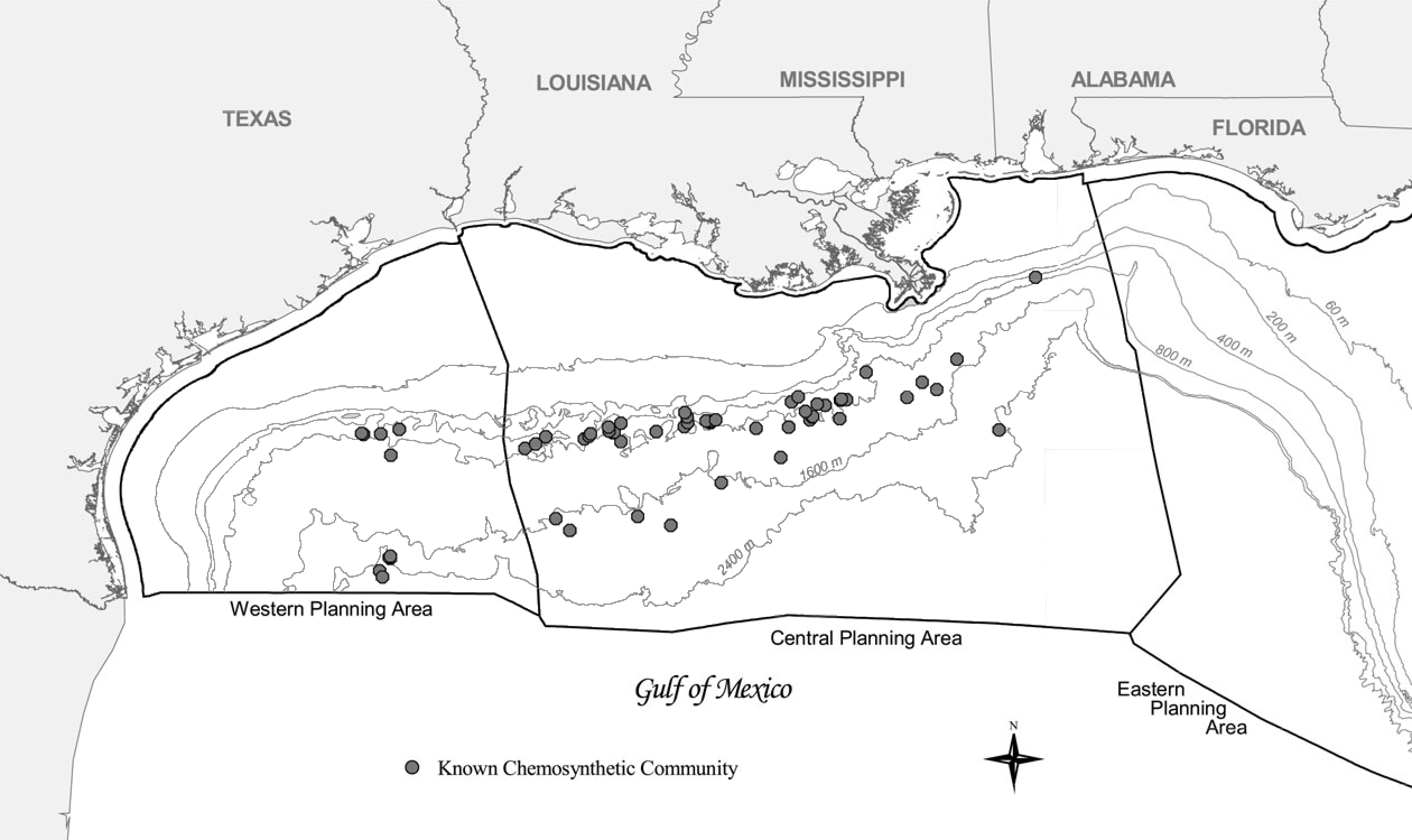
Chemosynthetic communities in the northern part of Gulf Of Mexico around cold seeps known in 2006 include more than 50 communities.

T. naticoidea lives in cold seeps in the northern Gulf of Mexico and in the accretionary wedge of Barbados in the Caribbean in the upper continental slope, in depths from 400 to 2100 m. Minimum recorded depth is 541 m. Maximum recorded depth is 1135 m.

Examples of localities include:

- "Bush Hill" (27°46.9478 N; 91°30.5266 W)
- methane seep "Brine Pool NR-1" in depth 650 m (27°43.415 N; 91°16.756 W)
- GC 234 (27°44.7318 N; 91°13.4355 W)
- MC 929

== Description ==
T. naticoidea has a shell that can be closed with a calcareous operculum. The round shell is low-spired and smoothly sculptured. Its aperture has roughly a semicircular shape. The maximum recorded shell length is 16 mm.

== Ecology ==
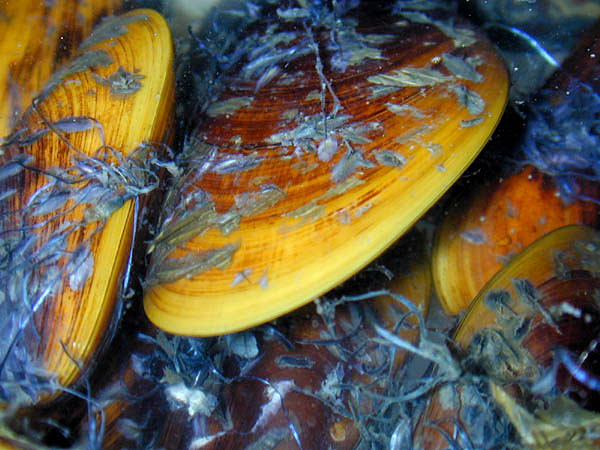
The mussel species Bathymodiolus childressi, with which T. naticoidea is often associated

=== Habitat ===
T. naticoidea lives at deep-sea cold seeps where hydrocarbons (oil and methane) are leaking out of the seafloor. T. naticoidea is the most numerous gastropod species in its area. They have also been found near a brine pool seep in the Gulf of Mexico. T. naticoidea cannot move over mud or on soft sediments, and usually lives on beds of Bathymodiolus childressi mussels. T. naticoidea can detect beds of B. childressi, because it is attracted by a water altered by this species of mussel, although the nature of the attractant is unknown.

As a euryhaline species, these snails normally live in saline water. Their preferred salinity is 30-50 ‰, and although they can survive salinity as high as 85 ‰, they actively avoid brine with salinity over 60 ‰. They usually move upward in natural conditions, where the concentration of salt is lower. T. naticoidea has no osmoregulatory ability when the salinity is too high, but it can survive high salinities, because it closes its operculum.

=== Feeding habits ===
T. naticoidea feeds on periphyton of methanotrophic bacteria that grow on shells of mussels of B. childressi; the decomposing periostracum of these mussels; their byssal fibers; and their detritus.

=== Life cycle ===
Oogenesis and formation of yolk (vitellogenesis) of T. naticoidea was described by Eckelbarger & Young (1997). This was the first ultrastructural description of formation of yolk in today's clade Neritimorpha. This process is similar to other gastropods.

Spermatogenesis of T. naticoidea was described by Hodgson et al. (1998). T. naticoidea has sperm (eusperm) of introsperm type (about 90 μm long and filiform), so it can be presumed, that the fertilisation of T. naticoidea is internal.

Eggs are laid in round and white-rimmed egg capsules on various hard substrata: the dorsal part of the shells of the mussel Bathymodiolus childressi. They were found also on shells of mussel Tamu fisheri. There are then scars from these egg capsules on these mussels. Highest number of eggs are laid from December to February. Eggs are 135-145 μm in diameter. There are 25-180 eggs in one eggs capsule. The length of the egg capsule ranges from 1.2 to 2.9 mm.

During the development of the embryo, the egg capsule is changing color from creamy ivory color to dark purple color. The cleavage is holoblastic spiral cleavage as in other gastropods.

Veliger larvae are hatched from eggs after four months of development from May to early July. Veliger is about 170 μm long (120-278 μm). Veligers feed on plankton (planktotrophic) and they are probably obligate planktotrophs. They can swim with ciliated foot and they are swimming probably for at least eight months. Veliger have pigmented eyespots. Maybe the same chemosensory mechanisms for detecting mussel beds can be used by its larvae. Veliger in size 600-700 μm can undergo metamorphosis into a snail. Only two protoconchs are known to be found in situ and they measured 630 μm and 615 μm in length.

=== Interspecific relationships ===
There lives a fungal filamentous ascomycete (phylum Ascomycota) species as a commensal on the gills of T. naticoidea. These fungi are externally attached to cells of gills. When this discovery was published in 1999, it was the first such association between fungus and gastropod from underwater seep community. The origin and function of this association is unknown.

There are no known bacterial symbionts with T. naticoidea (1999).

Other animals living in communities with T. naticoidea include:

- polychaete Methanoaricia dendrobranchiata from family Orbiniidae
- mussels Bathymodiolus childressi from family Mytilidae

== Genetics ==
Partial genetic sequences of mitochondrion of T. naticoidea were published in 1996 and in 2008:

- 28S ribosomal RNA
- cytochrome-c oxidase I (COI) gene
- 16S ribosomal RNA
