= Émile-Félix Gautier =

French geographer

Émile-Félix Gautier or Gauthier (19 October 1864 – 16 January 1940) was a French geographer.

Gautier was born in Clermont-Ferrand. His studies focused on northern Africa, especially Algeria, the Sahara desert and the territories of French Africa. He also conducted research in the French colony of Madagascar. He died, aged 75, in Pontivy (Saint-Pierre-de-Quiberon).

During his career, he taught classes at the École supérieure des lettres in Algiers, and was also a director of education in Madagascar. In 1922, he became a member of the Académie des sciences d'outre-mer.

== Works ==
- Madagascar : essai de géographie physique (1902) – Madagascar, essay of physical geography.
- Études d’ethnographie saharienne, l’Anthropologie XVIII, 1907 – Studies of Saharan ethnography.
- L’Algérie et la métropole, 1920 – Algeria and the metropolis.
- Les Territoires du Sud. Description géographique, Gouvernement Général de l’Algérie, 1922 – The territories of the south, a geographical description.
- L’Islamisation de l’Afrique du Nord. Les siècles obscurs du Moghreb, 1927 – Islamization of North Africa. Dark Ages of the Maghreb.
- Le Sahara (1928: translated as "Sahara, the Great Desert" by Dorothy Ford Mayhew, 1935).
- Un Siècle de colonisation (1930) – A century of colonization.
- Le Monument de Tin Hinan (Annales de l’Académie des sciences coloniales) t. VII, 1934 (with Maurice Reygasse).
- L'Afrique blanche (1939) – White Africa.
- Missions au Sahara (with René Chudeau)
