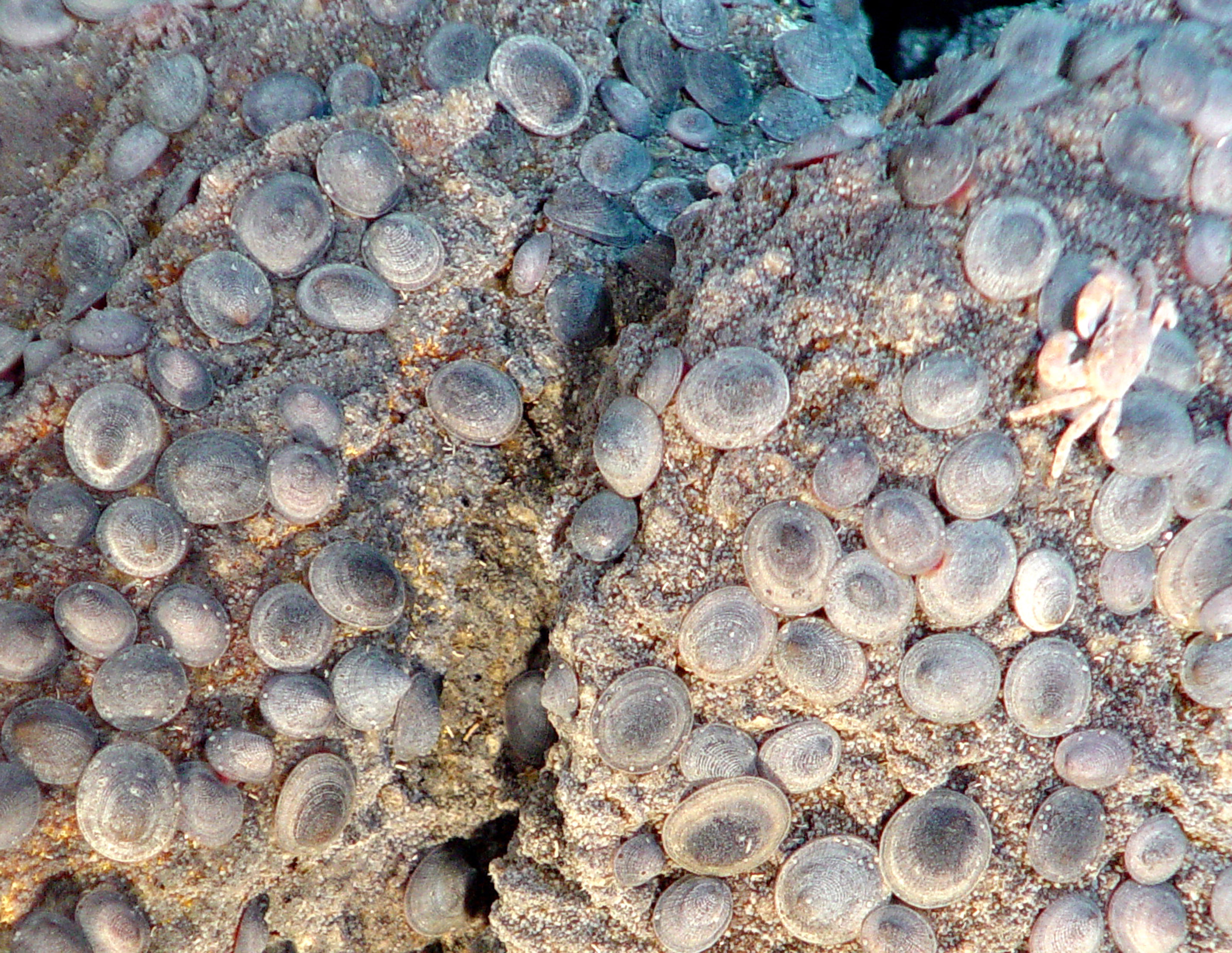
- A large number of adults and egg cases (white dots) of the hydrothermal vent species Shinkailepas kaikatensis with an arc crab on the right

Scientific classification
- Kingdom: Animalia
- Phylum: Mollusca
- Class: Gastropoda
- Order: Cycloneritida
- Superfamily: Neritoidea
- Family: Phenacolepadidae; Pilsbry, 1895

Genera
- See text

Synonyms
- Scutellidae Angas, 1871 (inv.); Scutellinidae Dall, 1889 (inv.); Shinkailepadidae Okutani, Saito & Hashimoto, 1989

= Phenacolepadidae =

Family of molluscs

Phenacolepadidae is a family of small sea snails or false limpets, marine gastropod mollusks in the clade Cycloneritimorpha (according to the taxonomy of the Gastropoda by Bouchet & Rocroi, 2005).

This family has no subfamilies according to the taxonomy of the Gastropoda by Bouchet & Rocroi, 2005.

Although the shell shape of genera in this family is that of a limpet, the family is in fact closely related to the Neritidae, the nerites.

== Genera and species ==
Genera and species within the family Phenacolepadidae include:

- Subfamily Phenacolepadinae Pilsbry, 1895
  - Hyalopatina Dall, 1889
  - Magadis Melvill & Standen, 1899
  - Plesiothyreus Cossman, 1888
  - Zacalantica Iredale, 1929
- Subfamily Shinkailepadinae Okutani, Saito & Hashimoto, 1989
  - Divia Fukumori, Yahagi, Warén & Kano, 2019
  - Shinkailepas Okutani et al., 1989 - a hydrothermal vent genus
  - Thalassonerita Moroni, 1966

Genera brought into synonymy

- Cinnalapeta Iredale, 1929: synonym of Plesiothyreus Cossmann, 1888
- Olgasolaris L. Beck, 1992: synonym of Shinkailepas Okutani, Saito & Hashimoto, 1989
- Phenacolepas Pilsbry, 1891: synonym of Plesiothyreus Cossmann, 1888
- Scutellina Gray, 1847: synonym of Plesiothyreus Cossmann, 1888
