= Philippe Dautzenberg =

Belgian zoologist

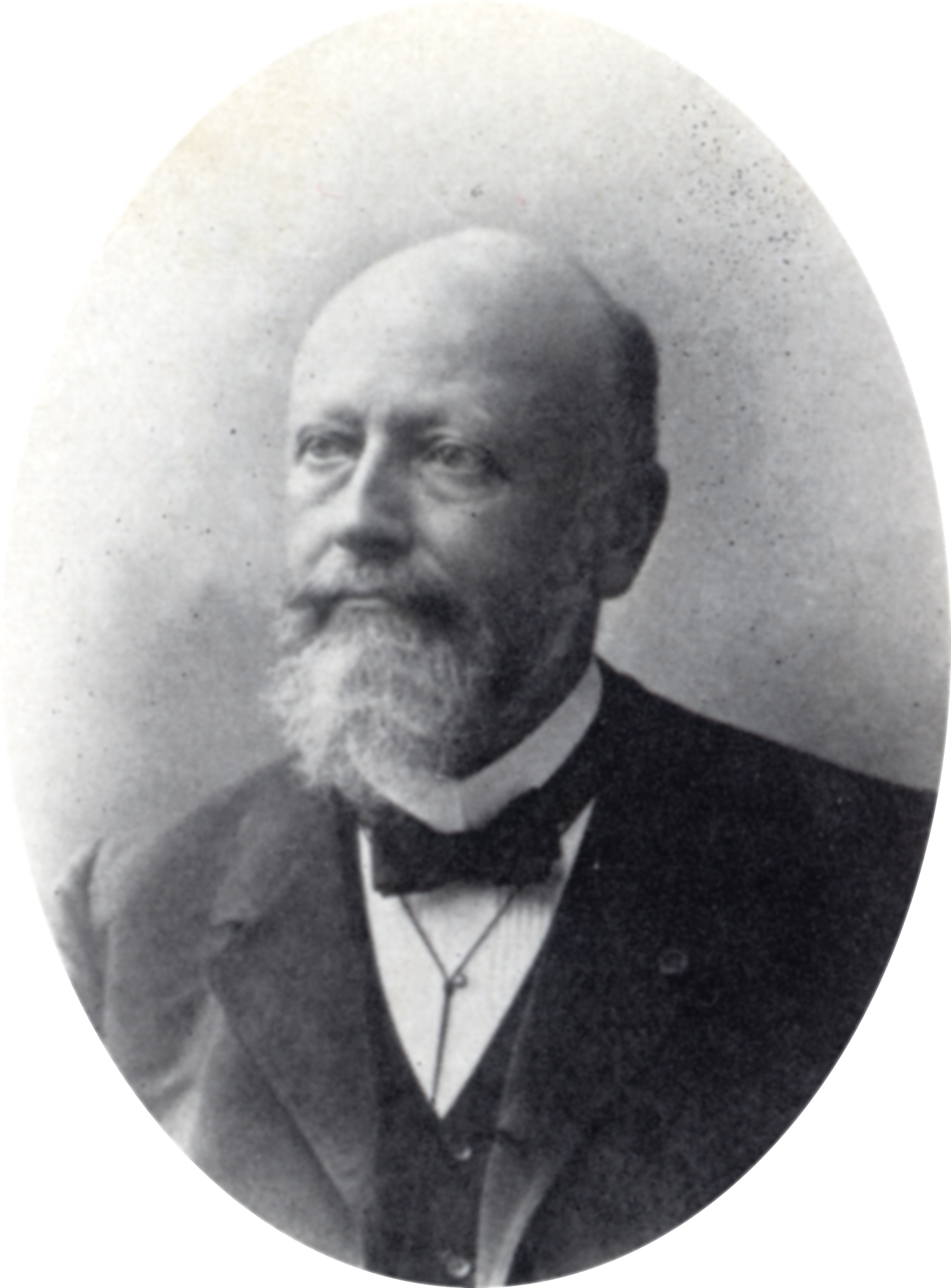
Philippe Dautzenberg.

Philippe Dautzenberg (20 December 1849, in Ixelles, Brussels – 9 May 1935, in Paris) was a Belgian malacologist, a biologist who specializes in the branch of invertebrate zoology that deals with mollusks. He was an amateur and autodidact, who was actually the owner of a carpet and soft furnishings factory. He was also a devoted family man with 12 children.

He assembled, thanks to his many connections all over the world, a large part of the shell collection of the Royal Belgian Institute of Natural Sciences, which consists of 9,000,000 specimens and is one of the three largest shell collections in the world.

He was a participant in the scientific surveys of Prince Albert I of Monaco and the author of 210 published works (between 1881 and 1937 (post mortem) ) in the field of malacology. He described 1895 new taxa. He collected shells from an early age, resulting in his personal collection of about 4.5 million specimens, relating to 33,000 Recent taxa and 7,000 fossil species. He referenced 82,000 specimens on filing cards.

He belonged to several scientific societies in Belgium and France, including the Société royale malacologique de Belgique, Société linnéenne de Lyon (1921–1935) and the Société d'histoire naturelle de l'Afrique du Nord (1926). In 1892 he was named president of the Société zoologique de France.

== Selected works ==
- Contribution à la faune malacologique des Îles Açores, 1889 – Contribution to the malacological fauna of the Azores.
- Voyage de la goelette Melita aux Canaries et au Sénégal 1889-–890 – Voyage of the schooner Melita to the Canary Islands and Senegal in 1889–90).
- Contribution à la faune malacologique de l'Indo-Chine, (with H Fischer), 1906 – Contribution to the malacological fauna of Indochina.
- Mollusques et brachiopodes, 1910 – Mollusks and brachiopods.
- Pectinidés, 1912 (with Arthur René Jean Baptiste Bavay) – Pectinidae.
- Sinistrorsités et dextrorsités tératologiques chez les mollusques gastéropodes, 1914.
- Faunule malacologique marine du Val-André (Côtes-du-Nord), 1920 – Marine malacological fauna of Val-André (Côtes-du-Nord).
- Dautzenberg P. (1923) "Mollusques terrestres de la Nouvelle-Calédonie et des îles Loyalty". 135–156. In: Sarasin F. & Roux J. (eds.) (1923). Nova Caledonia. Forschungen in Neu-Caledonien und auf den Loyalty-Inseln. Recherches scientifiques en Nouvelle-Calédonie et aux iles Loyalty. A. Zoologie Volume III.(1), C. D. Kriedel's Verlag,
- Mollusques testacés marins de Madagascar, 1929 – Marine shellfish of Madagascar.
- "Ph. Dautzenberg's collection of Cypraeidae", (in English, 1952; with F. A. Schilder; Maria Schilder); part of series: Institut royal des sciences naturelles de Belgique; Mémoires.

== Taxa described by him ==
- See Category:Taxa named by Philippe Dautzenberg

== Taxa named after him ==
- Gudeodiscus dautzenbergi (Gude, 1901) is a species of air-breathing land snail, a terrestrial pulmonate gastropod mollusk in the family Plectopylidae.
