= Hydrothermal vent =

Fissure in a planet's surface from which heated water emits

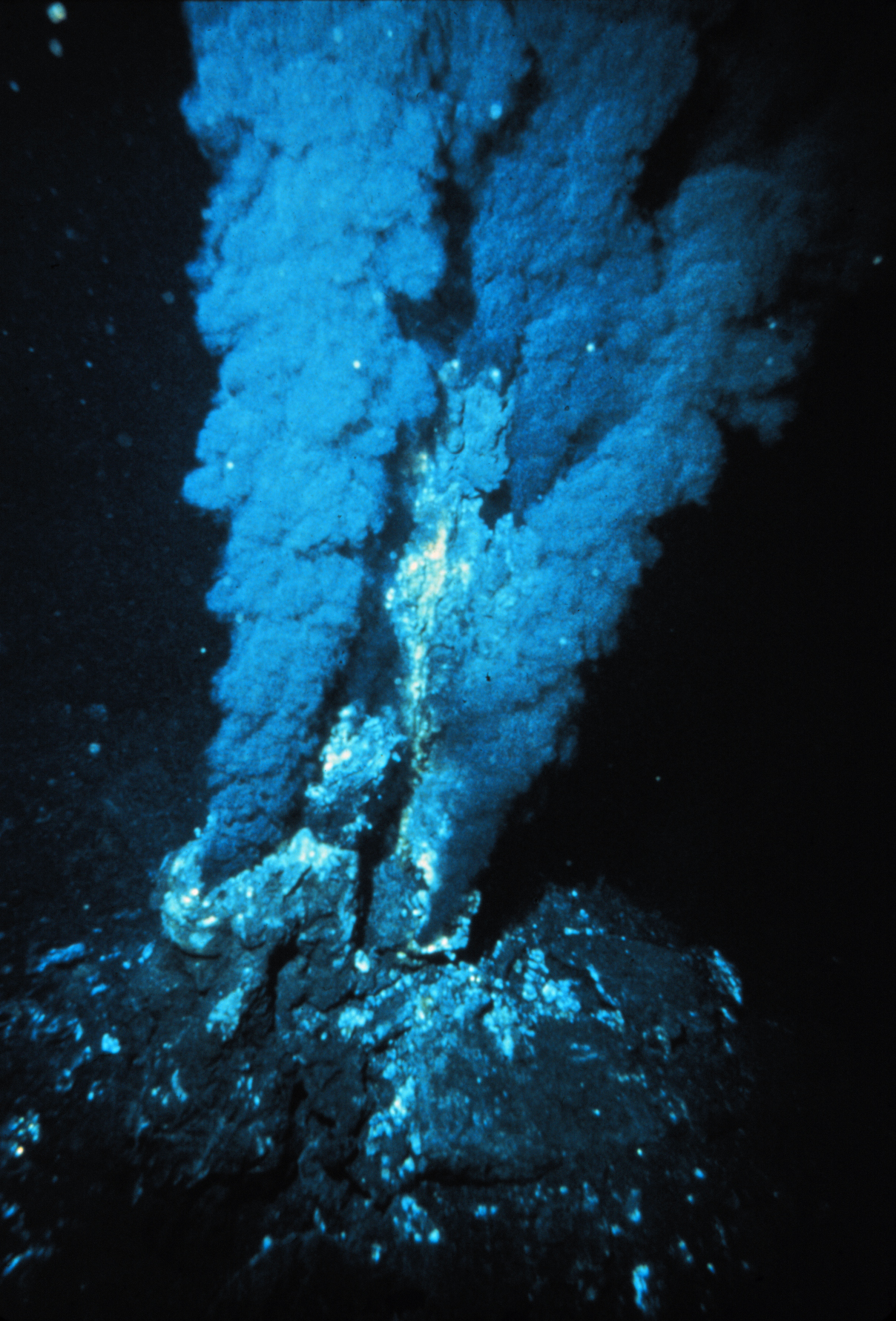
Black smoker in the Atlantic Ocean

Hydrothermal vents are fissures on the seabed from which geothermally heated water discharges. They are commonly found near volcanically active places, areas where tectonic plates are moving apart at mid-ocean ridges, ocean basins, and hotspots. The dispersal of hydrothermal fluids throughout the global ocean at active vent sites creates hydrothermal plumes. Hydrothermal deposits are rocks and mineral ore deposits formed by the action of hydrothermal vents.

Hydrothermal vents exist because the Earth is both geologically active and has large amounts of water on its surface and within its crust. Under the sea, they may form features called black smokers or white smokers, which deliver a wide range of elements to the world's oceans, thus contributing to global marine biogeochemistry. Relative to the majority of the deep sea, the areas around hydrothermal vents are biologically more productive, often hosting complex communities fueled by the chemicals dissolved in the vent fluids. Chemosynthetic bacteria and archaea found around hydrothermal vents form the base of the food chain, supporting diverse organisms including giant tube worms, clams, limpets, and shrimp. Active hydrothermal vents are thought to exist on Jupiter's moon Europa and Saturn's moon Enceladus, and it is speculated that ancient hydrothermal vents once existed on Mars.

Hydrothermal vents have been hypothesized to have been a significant factor to starting abiogenesis and the survival of primitive life. The conditions of these vents have been shown to support the synthesis of molecules important to life. Some evidence suggests that certain vents such as alkaline hydrothermal vents or those containing supercritical CO_{2} are more conducive to the formation of these organic molecules.

== Physical properties ==
NOAA video on hydrothermal vents

Hydrothermal vents in the deep ocean typically form along the mid-ocean ridges, such as the East Pacific Rise and the Mid-Atlantic Ridge. These are locations where two tectonic plates are diverging and new crust is being formed.

The water that issues from seafloor hydrothermal vents consists mostly of seawater drawn into the hydrothermal system close to the volcanic edifice through faults and porous sediments or volcanic strata, plus some magmatic water released by the upwelling magma. On land, the majority of water circulated within fumarole and geyser systems is meteoric water and ground water that has percolated down into the hydrothermal system from the surface, but also commonly contains some portion of metamorphic water, magmatic water, and sedimentary formational brine released by the magma. The proportion of each varies from location to location.

In contrast to the approximately 2 °C (36 °F) ambient water temperature at these depths, water emerges from these vents at temperatures ranging from 60 °C (140 °F) up to as high as 464 °C (867 °F). Due to the high hydrostatic pressure at these depths, water may exist in either its liquid form or as a supercritical fluid at such temperatures. The critical point of (pure) water is 375 °C (707 °F) at a pressure of 218 atmospheres.

However, introducing salinity into the fluid raises the critical point to higher temperatures and pressures. The critical point of seawater (3.2 wt. % NaCl) is 407 °C (765 °F) and 298.5 bars, corresponding to a depth of ~2,960 m (9,710 ft) below sea level. Accordingly, if a hydrothermal fluid with a salinity of 3.2 wt. % NaCl vents above 407 °C (765 °F) and 298.5 bars, it is supercritical. Furthermore, the salinity of vent fluids have been shown to vary widely due to phase separation in the crust. The critical point for lower salinity fluids is at lower temperature and pressure conditions than that for seawater, but higher than that for pure water. For example, a vent fluid with a 2.24 wt. % NaCl salinity has the critical point at 400 °C (752 °F) and 280.5 bars. Thus, water emerging from the hottest parts of some hydrothermal vents can be a supercritical fluid, possessing physical properties between those of a gas and those of a liquid.

In this phase diagram, the green dotted line illustrates the anomalous behavior of water. The dashed gray line from the triple point falls onto the melting point and the one from the critical point falls onto the boiling point on the Temperature axis, showing how they vary with pressure; the solid green line shows the typical melting point behavior for other substances.

Examples of supercritical venting are found at several sites. Sister Peak (Comfortless Cove Hydrothermal Field, 4°48′S 12°22′W, depth 2,996 m or 9,829 ft) vents low salinity phase-separated, vapor-type fluids. Sustained venting was not found to be supercritical but a brief injection of 464 °C (867 °F) was well above supercritical conditions. A nearby site, Turtle Pits, was found to vent low salinity fluid at 407 °C (765 °F), which is above the critical point of the fluid at that salinity. A vent site in the Cayman Trough named Beebe, which is the world's deepest known hydrothermal site at ~5,000 m (16,000 ft) below sea level, has shown sustained supercritical venting at 401 °C (754 °F) and 2.3 wt% NaCl.

Although supercritical conditions have been observed at several sites, it is not yet known what significance, if any, supercritical venting has in terms of hydrothermal circulation, mineral deposit formation, geochemical fluxes or biological activity.

The initial stages of a vent chimney begin with the deposition of the mineral anhydrite. Sulfides of copper, iron, and zinc then precipitate in the chimney gaps, making it less porous over the course of time. Vent growths on the order of 30 cm (1 ft) per day have been recorded. An April 2007 exploration of the deep-sea vents off the coast of Fiji found those vents to be a significant source of dissolved iron (see iron cycle).

== Black smokers and white smokers ==
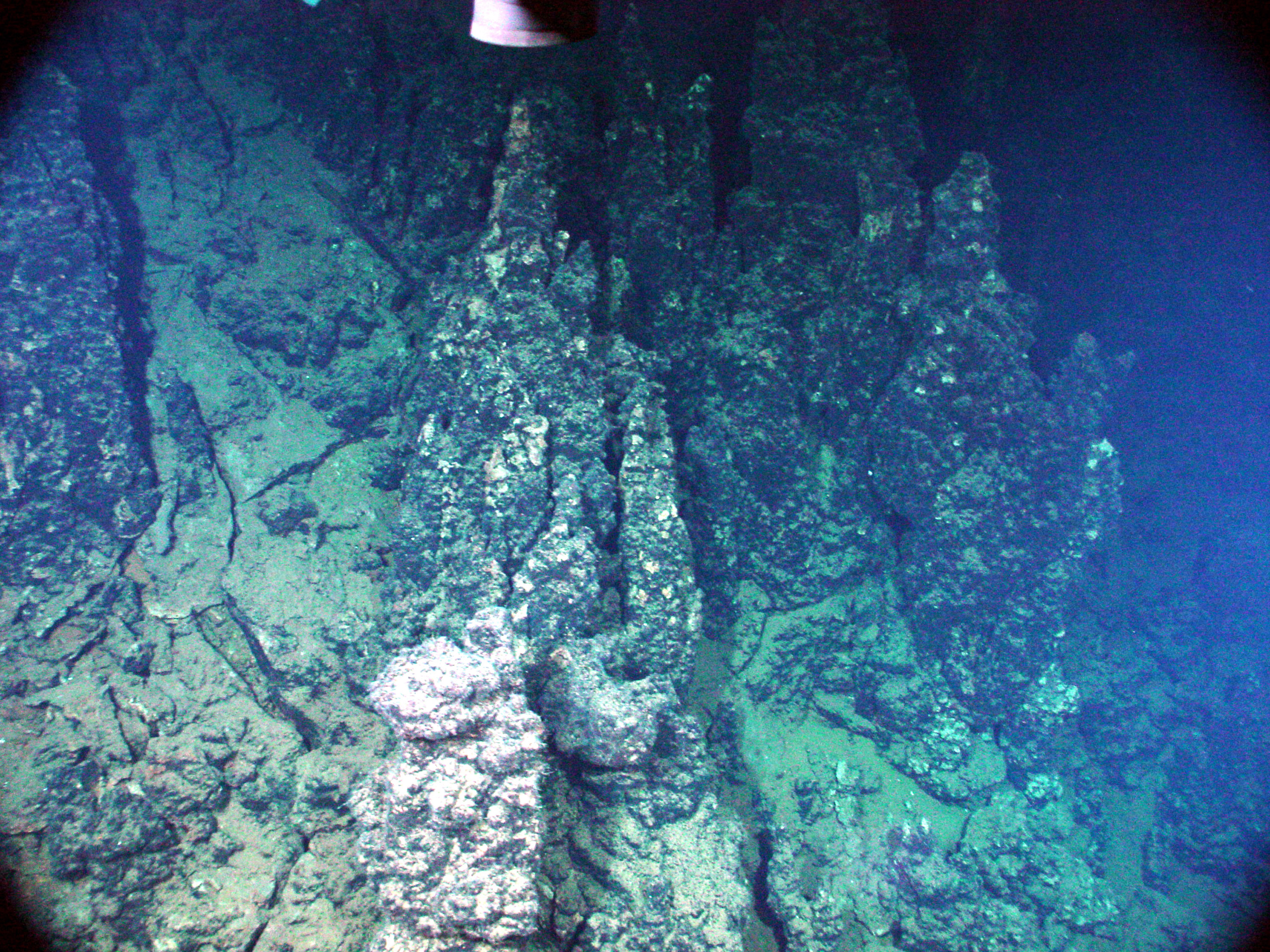
Extinct smokers

Some hydrothermal vents form roughly cylindrical chimney structures. These form from minerals that are dissolved in the vent fluid. When the superheated water contacts the near-freezing sea water, the minerals precipitate out to form particles which add to the height of the stacks. Some of these chimney structures can reach heights of 60 m (200 ft). An example of such a towering vent was "Godzilla", a structure on the Pacific Ocean deep seafloor near Oregon that rose to 40 m (130 ft) before it fell over in 1996.

=== Black smokers ===
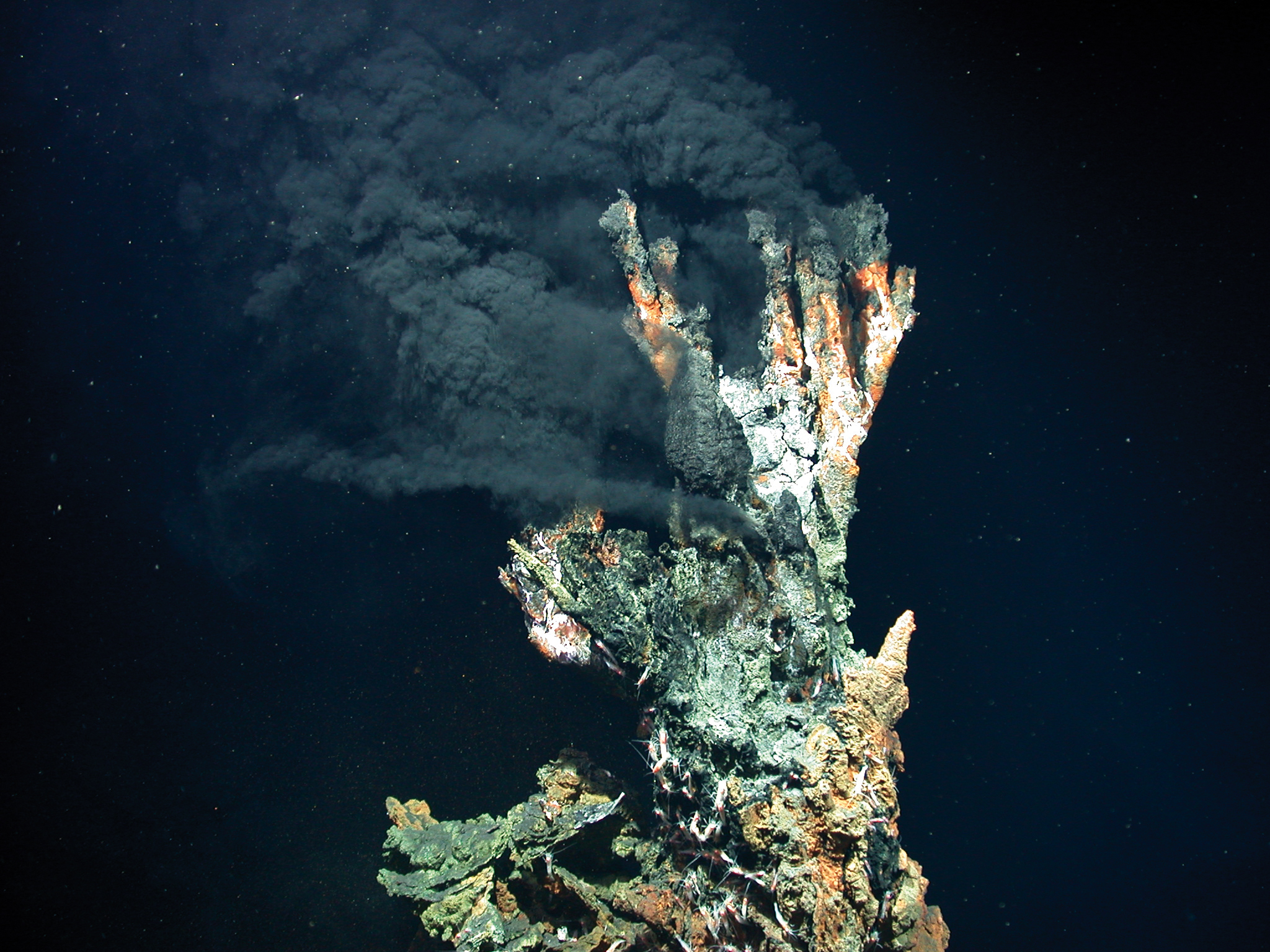
The black smoker "Candelabra" in the Logatchev hydrothermal field on the Mid-Atlantic Ridge at a water depth of 3,300 m (10,800 ft)

Sound recording from a black smoker

A black smoker or deep-sea vent is a type of hydrothermal vent found on the seabed, typically in the bathyal zone (with largest frequency in depths from 2,500 to 3,000 m (8,200 to 9,800 ft)), but also in lesser depths as well as deeper in the abyssal zone. They appear as black, chimney-like structures that emit a cloud of black material. Black smokers typically emit particles with high levels of sulfur-bearing minerals, or sulfides. Black smokers are formed in fields hundreds of meters wide when superheated water from below Earth's crust comes through the ocean floor (water may attain temperatures above 400 °C (752 °F)). This water is rich in dissolved minerals from the crust, most notably sulfides. When it comes in contact with cold ocean water, many minerals precipitate, forming a black, chimney-like structure around each vent. Chimneys thicken due to heat conduction encouraging crystallization. The deposited metal sulfides can become massive sulfide ore deposits in time. Some black smokers along the Azores segment of the Mid-Atlantic Ridge are exceptionally metal-rich; for instance, hydrothermal fluids from the Rainbow Vent Field contain up to 24,000 μM of dissolved iron.

Black smokers were first discovered in 1979 on the East Pacific Rise by scientists from Scripps Institution of Oceanography during the RISE Project. They were observed using the deep submergence vehicle ALVIN from the Woods Hole Oceanographic Institution. Now, black smokers are known to exist in the Atlantic and Pacific Oceans, at an average depth of 2,100 m (6,900 ft). The most northerly black smokers are a cluster of five named Loki's Castle, discovered in 2008 by scientists from the University of Bergen at 73°N, on the Mid-Atlantic Ridge between Greenland and Norway. These black smokers are of interest as they are in a more stable area of the Earth's crust, where tectonic forces are less and consequently fields of hydrothermal vents are less common. The world's deepest known black smokers are located in the Cayman Trough, 5,000 m (3.1 miles) below the ocean's surface.

=== White smokers ===
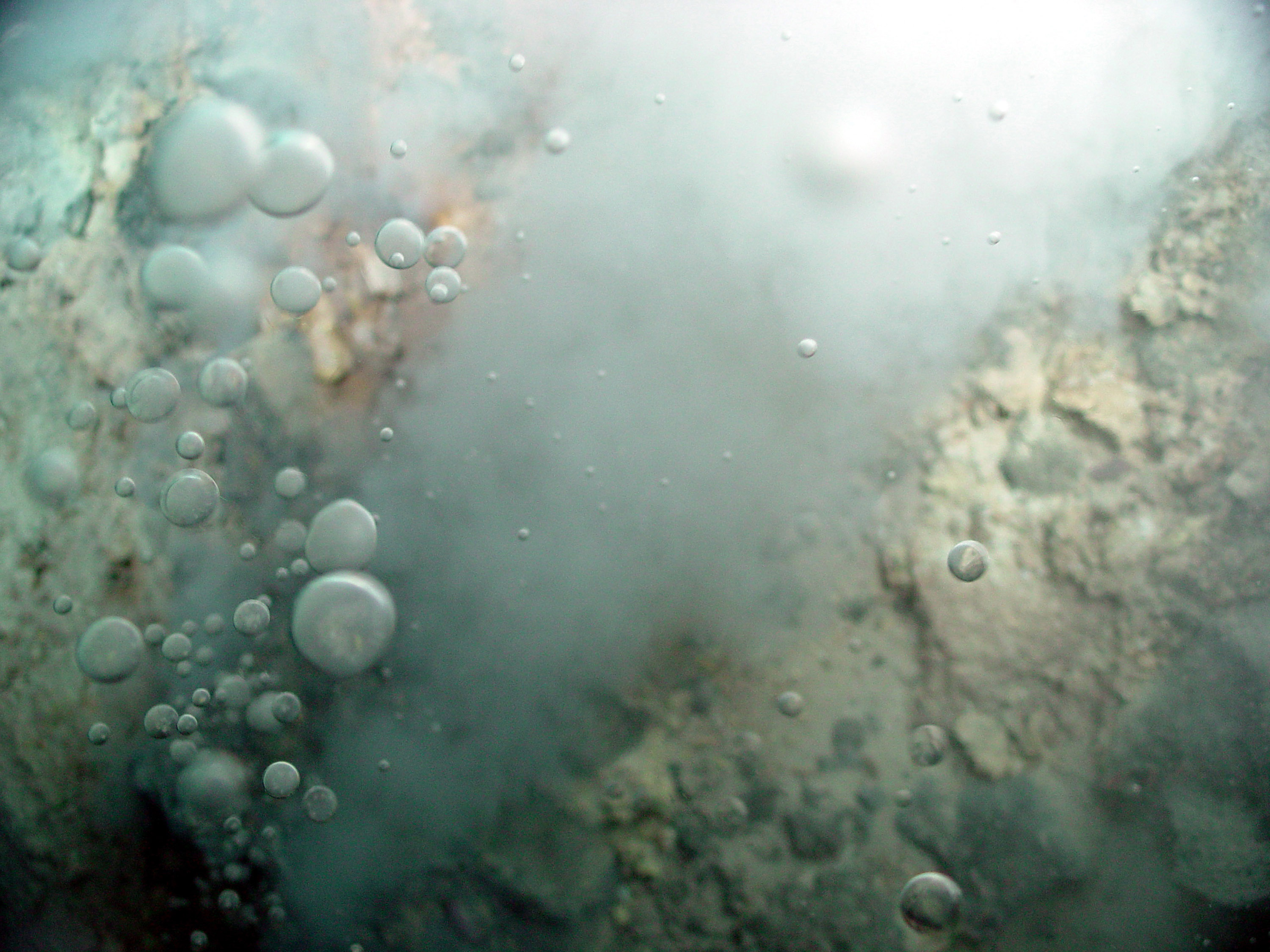
Carbon dioxide bubbles are emitted from white smokers at the Champagne vent site in Eifuku.

White smoker vents emit lighter-hued minerals, such as those containing barium, calcium and silicon. These vents also tend to have lower-temperature plumes probably because they are generally distant from their heat source.

Black and white smokers may coexist in the same hydrothermal field, but they generally represent proximal (close) and distal (distant) vents to the main upflow zone, respectively. However, white smokers correspond mostly to waning stages of such hydrothermal fields, as magmatic heat sources become progressively more distant from the source (due to magma crystallization) and hydrothermal fluids become dominated by seawater instead of magmatic water. Mineralizing fluids from this type of vent are rich in calcium and they form dominantly sulfate-rich (i.e., barite and anhydrite) and carbonate deposits.

== Hydrothermal plumes ==
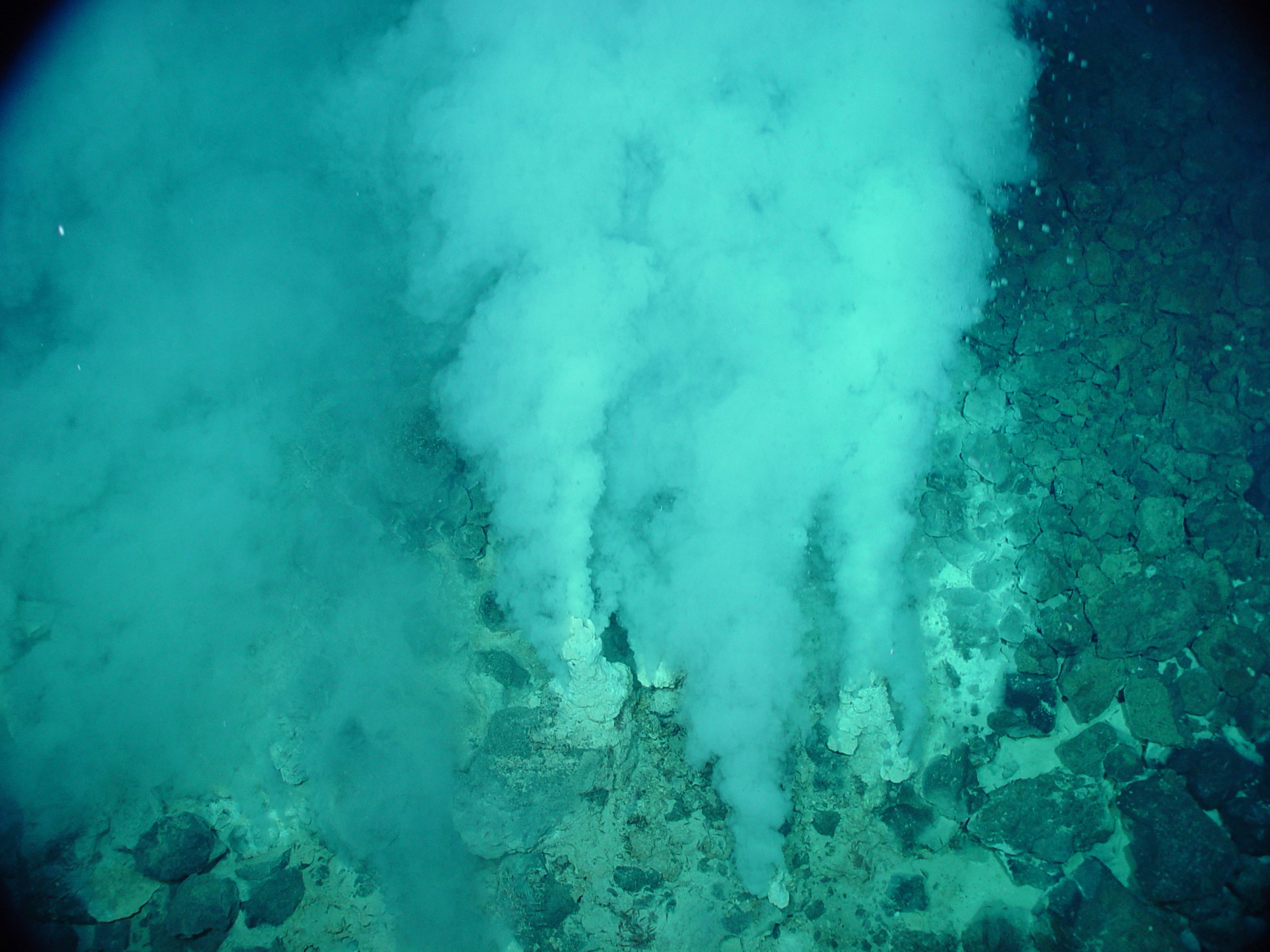
White smokers at Champagne Vent, Eifuku, Japan

Hydrothermal plumes are fluid entities that manifest where hydrothermal fluids are expelled into the overlying water column at active hydrothermal vent sites. As hydrothermal fluids typically harbor physical (e.g., temperature, density) and chemical (e.g., pH, Eh, major ions) properties distinct from seawater, hydrothermal plumes embody physical and chemical gradients that promote several types of chemical reactions, including oxidation-reduction reactions and precipitation reactions.

Hydrothermal vent fluids harbor temperatures (~40 to >400 °C) well above that of ocean floor seawater (~4 °C), meaning that hydrothermal fluid is less dense than the surrounding seawater and will rise through the water column due to buoyancy, forming a hydrothermal plume; therefore, the phase during which hydrothermal plumes rise through the water column is known as the "buoyant plume" phase. During this phase, shear forces between the hydrothermal plume and surrounding seawater generate turbulent flow that facilitates mixing between the two types of fluids, which progressively dilutes the hydrothermal plume with seawater. Eventually, the coupled effects of dilution and rising into progressively warmer (less dense) overlying seawater will cause the hydrothermal plume to become neutrally buoyant at some height above the seafloor; therefore, this stage of hydrothermal plume evolution is known as the "nonbuoyant plume" phase. Once the plume is neutrally buoyant, it can no longer continue to rise through the water column and instead begins to spread laterally throughout the ocean, potentially over several thousands of kilometers.

Chemical reactions occur concurrently with the physical evolution of hydrothermal plumes. While seawater is a relatively oxidizing fluid, hydrothermal vent fluids are typically reducing in nature. Consequently, reduced chemicals such as hydrogen gas, hydrogen sulfide, methane, Fe^{2+}, and Mn^{2+} that are common in many vent fluids will react upon mixing with seawater. In fluids with high concentrations of H_{2}S, dissolved metal ions such as Fe^{2+} and Mn^{2+} readily precipitate as dark-colored metal sulfide minerals (see "black smokers"). Furthermore, Fe^{2+} and Mn^{2+} entrained within the hydrothermal plume will eventually oxidize to form insoluble Fe and Mn (oxy)hydroxide minerals. For this reason, the hydrothermal "near field" has been proposed to refer to the hydrothermal plume region undergoing active oxidation of metals while the term "far field" refers to the plume region within which complete metal oxidation has occurred.

=== Identification and dating ===
Several chemical tracers found in hydrothermal plumes are used to locate deep-sea hydrothermal vents during discovery cruises. Useful tracers of hydrothermal activity should be chemically unreactive so that changes in tracer concentration subsequent to venting are due solely to dilution. The noble gas helium fits this criterion and is a particularly useful tracer of hydrothermal activity. This is because hydrothermal venting releases elevated concentrations of helium-3 relative to seawater, a rare, naturally occurring He isotope derived exclusively from the Earth's interior. Thus, the dispersal of ^{3}He throughout the oceans via hydrothermal plumes creates anomalous seawater He isotope compositions that signify hydrothermal venting. Another noble gas that can serve as a tracer of hydrothermal activity is radon. As all naturally occurring isotopes of Rn are radioactive, Rn concentrations in seawater can also provide information on hydrothermal plume ages when combined with He isotope data. The isotope radon-222 is utilized for this purpose as ^{222}Rn has the longest half-life of all naturally occurring radon isotopes of roughly 3.82 days. Dissolved gases, such as H_{2}, H_{2}S, and CH_{4}, and metals, such as Fe and Mn, present at high concentrations in hydrothermal vent fluids relative to seawater may also be diagnostic of hydrothermal plumes and thus active venting; however, these components are reactive and are thus less suitable as tracers of hydrothermal activity.

=== Ocean biogeochemistry ===
Diagram of biogeochemical processes within a hydrothermal vent system

Hydrothermal plumes represent an important mechanism through which hydrothermal systems influence marine biogeochemistry. Hydrothermal vents emit a wide variety of trace metals into the ocean, including Fe, Mn, Cr, Cu, Zn, Co, Ni, Mo, Cd, V, and W, many of which have biological functions. Numerous physical and chemical processes control the fate of these metals once they are expelled into the water column. Based on thermodynamic theory, Fe^{2+} and Mn^{2+} should oxidize in seawater to form insoluble metal (oxy)hydroxide precipitates; however, complexation with organic compounds and the formation of colloids and nanoparticles can keep these redox-sensitive elements suspended in solution far from the vent site.

Fe and Mn often have the highest concentrations among metals in acidic hydrothermal vent fluids, and both have biological significance, particularly Fe, which is often a limiting nutrient in marine environments. Therefore, far-field transport of Fe and Mn via organic complexation may constitute an important mechanism of ocean metal cycling. Additionally, hydrothermal vents deliver significant concentrations of other biologically important trace metals to the ocean such as Mo, which may have been important in the early chemical evolution of the Earth's oceans and to the origin of life (see "theory of hydrothermal origin of life"). However, Fe and Mn precipitates can also influence ocean biogeochemistry by removing trace metals from the water column. The charged surfaces of iron (oxy)hydroxide minerals effectively adsorb elements such as phosphorus, vanadium, arsenic, and rare earth metals from seawater; therefore, although hydrothermal plumes may represent a net source of metals such as Fe and Mn to the oceans, they can also scavenge other metals and non-metalliferous nutrients such as P from seawater, representing a net sink of these elements.

== Biology of hydrothermal vents ==
Life has traditionally been seen as driven by energy from the sun, but deep-sea organisms have no access to sunlight, so biological communities around hydrothermal vents must depend on nutrients found in the dusty chemical deposits and hydrothermal fluids in which they live. Previously, benthic oceanographers assumed that vent organisms were dependent on marine snow, as deep-sea organisms are. This would leave them dependent on plant life and thus the sun. Some hydrothermal vent organisms do consume this "rain", but with only such a system, life forms would be sparse. Compared to the surrounding sea floor, however, hydrothermal vent zones have a density of organisms 10,000 to 100,000 times greater.

The hydrothermal vents are recognized as a type of chemosynthetic based ecosystems (CBE) where primary productivity is fuelled by chemical compounds as energy sources instead of light (chemoautotrophy). Hydrothermal vent communities are able to sustain such vast amounts of life because vent organisms depend on chemosynthetic bacteria for food. The water from the hydrothermal vent is rich in dissolved minerals and supports a large population of chemoautotrophic bacteria. These bacteria use sulfur compounds, particularly hydrogen sulfide, a chemical highly toxic to most known organisms, to produce organic material through the process of chemosynthesis.

The vents' impact on the living environment goes beyond the organisms that lives around them, as they act as a significant source of iron in the oceans, providing iron for the phytoplankton.

=== Biological communities ===
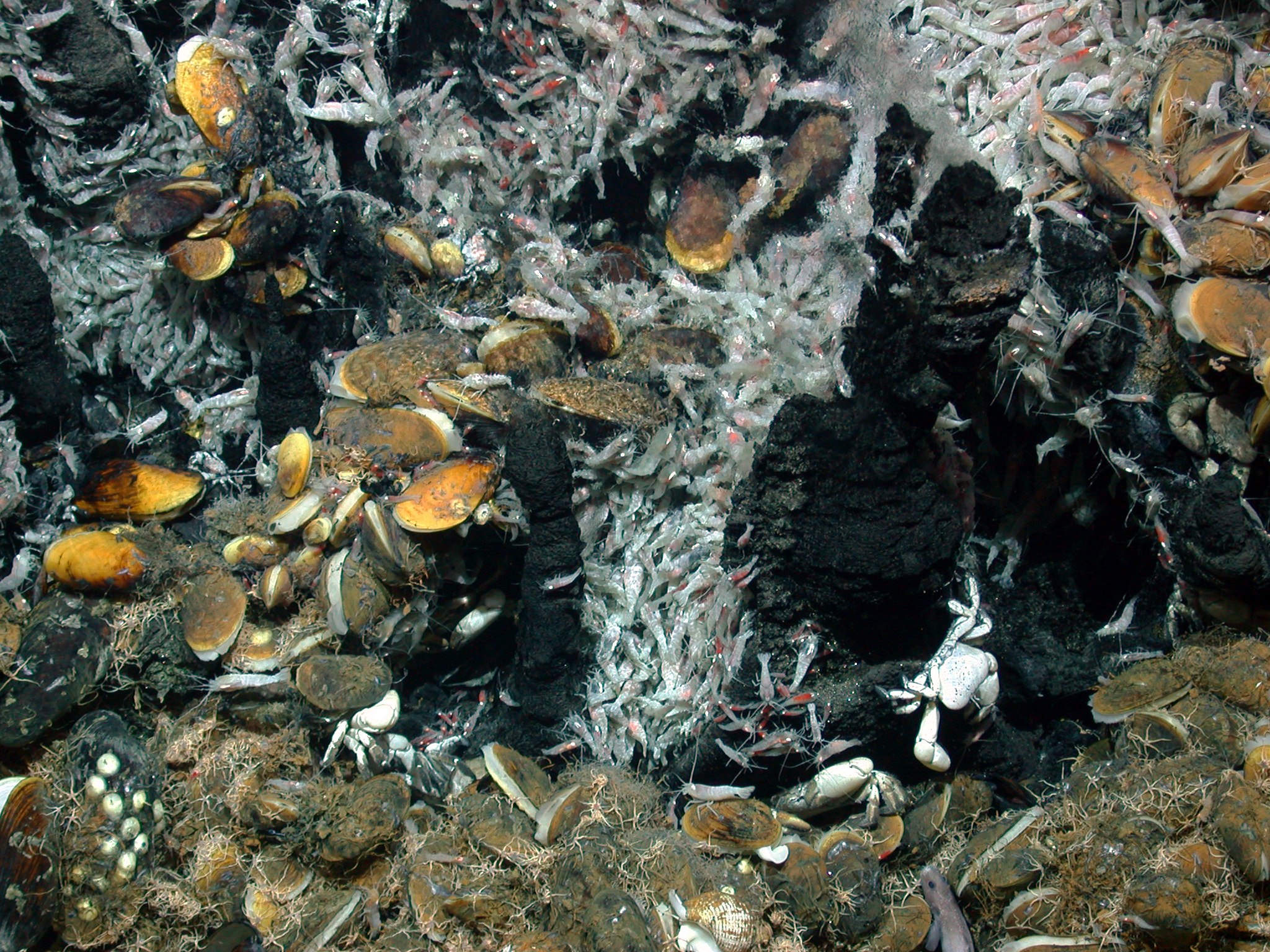
Living community at hydrothermal seeps on the Mid-Ocean Ridge at a water depth of 3,030 m (9,940 ft)

The oldest confirmed record of a "modern" biological community related with a vent is the Figueroa Sulfide, from the Early Jurassic of California. The ecosystem so formed is reliant upon the continued existence of the hydrothermal vent field as the primary source of energy, which differs from most surface life on Earth, which is based on solar energy. However, although it is often said that these communities exist independently of the sun, some of the organisms are actually dependent upon oxygen produced by photosynthetic organisms, while others are anaerobic.

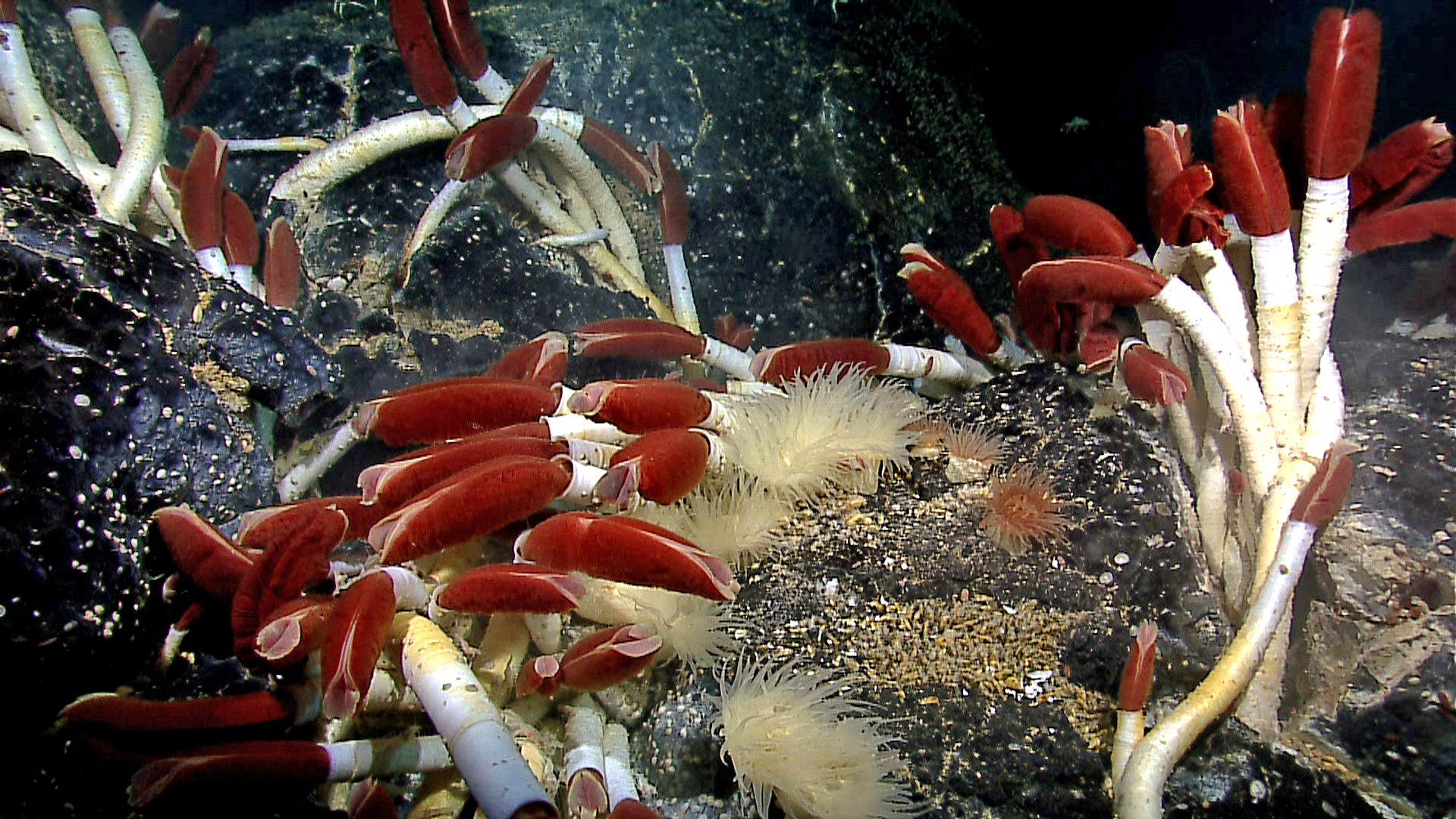
Giant tube worms (Riftia pachyptila) cluster around vents in the Galapagos Rift.

The chemosynthetic bacteria grow into a thick mat which attracts other organisms, such as amphipods and copepods, which graze upon the bacteria directly. Larger organisms, such as snails, shrimp, crabs, tube worms, fish (especially eelpout, cutthroat eel, Ophidiiformes and Symphurus thermophilus), and octopuses (notably Vulcanoctopus hydrothermalis), form a food chain of predator and prey relationships above the primary consumers. The main families of organisms found around seafloor vents are annelids, gastropods, and crustaceans, with large bivalves, vestimentiferan worms, and "eyeless" shrimp making up the bulk of nonmicrobial organisms.

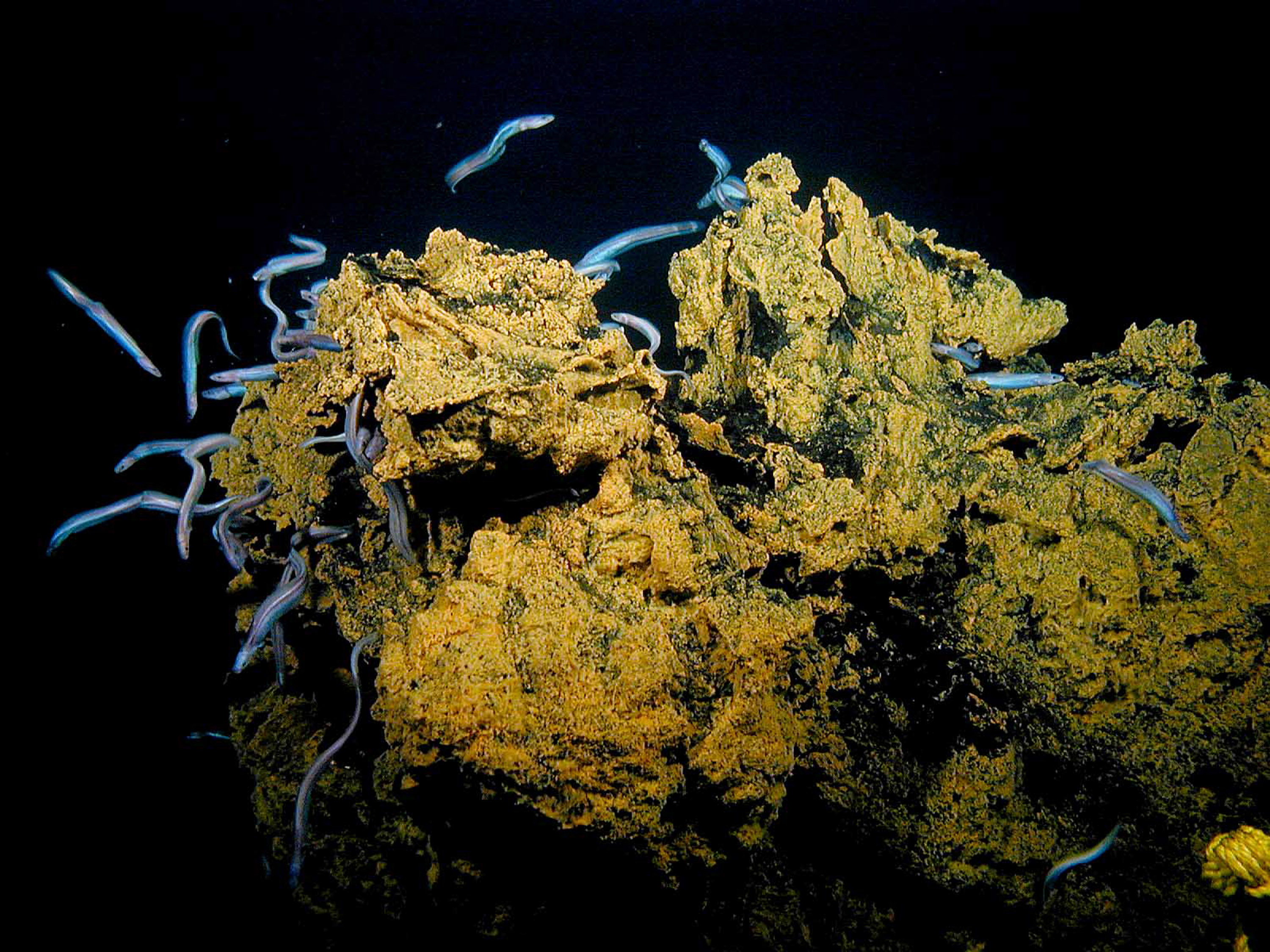
Swarms of small synaphobranchid eels, Dysommina rugosa, live in the crevices on the summit of Nafanua. Scientists dubbed this site "Eel City".

Siboglinid tube worms, which may grow to over 2 m (6.6 ft) tall in the largest species, often form an important part of the community around a hydrothermal vent. They have no mouth or digestive tract, and like parasitic worms, absorb nutrients produced by the bacteria in their tissues. About 285 billion bacteria are found per ounce of tubeworm tissue. Tubeworms have red plumes which contain hemoglobin. Hemoglobin combines with hydrogen sulfide and transfers it to the bacteria living inside the worm. In return, the bacteria nourish the worm with carbon compounds. Two of the species that inhabit a hydrothermal vent are Tevnia jerichonana, and Riftia pachyptila. One discovered community, dubbed "Eel City", consists predominantly of the eel Dysommina rugosa. Though eels are not uncommon, invertebrates typically dominate hydrothermal vents. Eel City is located near Nafanua volcanic cone, American Samoa.

In 1993, already more than 100 gastropod species were known to occur in hydrothermal vents. Over 300 new species have been discovered at hydrothermal vents, many of them "sister species" to others found in geographically separated vent areas. It has been proposed that before the North American Plate overrode the mid-ocean ridge, there was a single biogeographic vent region found in the eastern Pacific. The subsequent barrier to travel began the evolutionary divergence of species in different locations. The examples of convergent evolution seen between distinct hydrothermal vents is seen as major support for the theory of natural selection and of evolution as a whole.

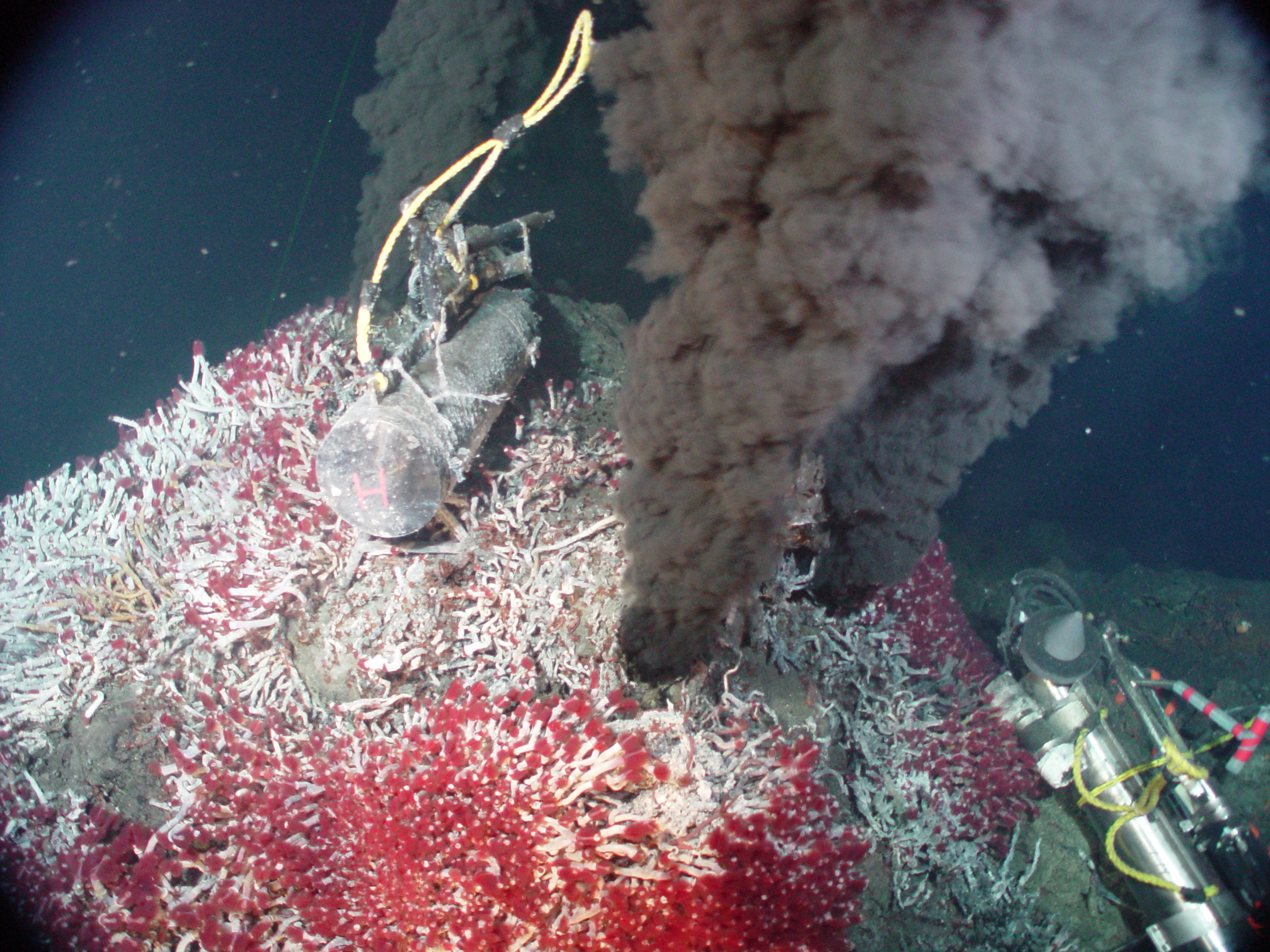
Giant tube worms at the base of a hydrothermal mount

Although life is very sparse at these depths, black smokers are the centers of entire ecosystems. Sunlight is nonexistent, so many organisms, such as archaea and extremophiles, convert the heat, methane, and sulfur compounds provided by black smokers into energy through a process called chemosynthesis. More complex life forms, such as clams and tubeworms, feed on these organisms. The organisms at the base of the food chain also deposit minerals into the base of the black smoker, therefore completing the life cycle.

A species of phototrophic bacterium has been found living near a black smoker off the coast of Mexico at a depth of 2,500 m (8,200 ft). No sunlight penetrates that far into the waters. Instead, the bacteria, part of the Chlorobiaceae family, use the faint glow from the black smoker for photosynthesis. This is the first organism discovered in nature to exclusively use a light other than sunlight for photosynthesis.

New and unusual species are constantly being discovered in the neighborhood of black smokers. The Pompeii worm Alvinella pompejana, which is capable of withstanding temperatures up to 80 °C (176 °F), was found in the 1980s, and the scaly-foot gastropod (Chrysomallon squamiferum) was first found in 2001 during an expedition to the Indian Ocean's Kairei hydrothermal vent field. The latter uses iron sulfides (pyrite and greigite) for the structure of its dermal sclerites (hardened body parts), instead of calcium carbonate. The extreme pressure of 2,500 m of water (approximately 25 megapascals or 250 atmospheres) is thought to play a role in stabilizing iron sulfide for biological purposes. This armor plating probably serves as a defense against the venomous radula (teeth) of predatory snails in that community.

In March 2017, researchers reported evidence of possibly the oldest forms of life on Earth. Putative fossilized microorganisms were discovered in hydrothermal vent precipitates in the Nuvvuagittuq Belt of Quebec, Canada, that may have lived as early as 4.280 billion years ago, not long after the oceans formed 4.4 billion years ago, and not long after the formation of the Earth 4.54 billion years ago.

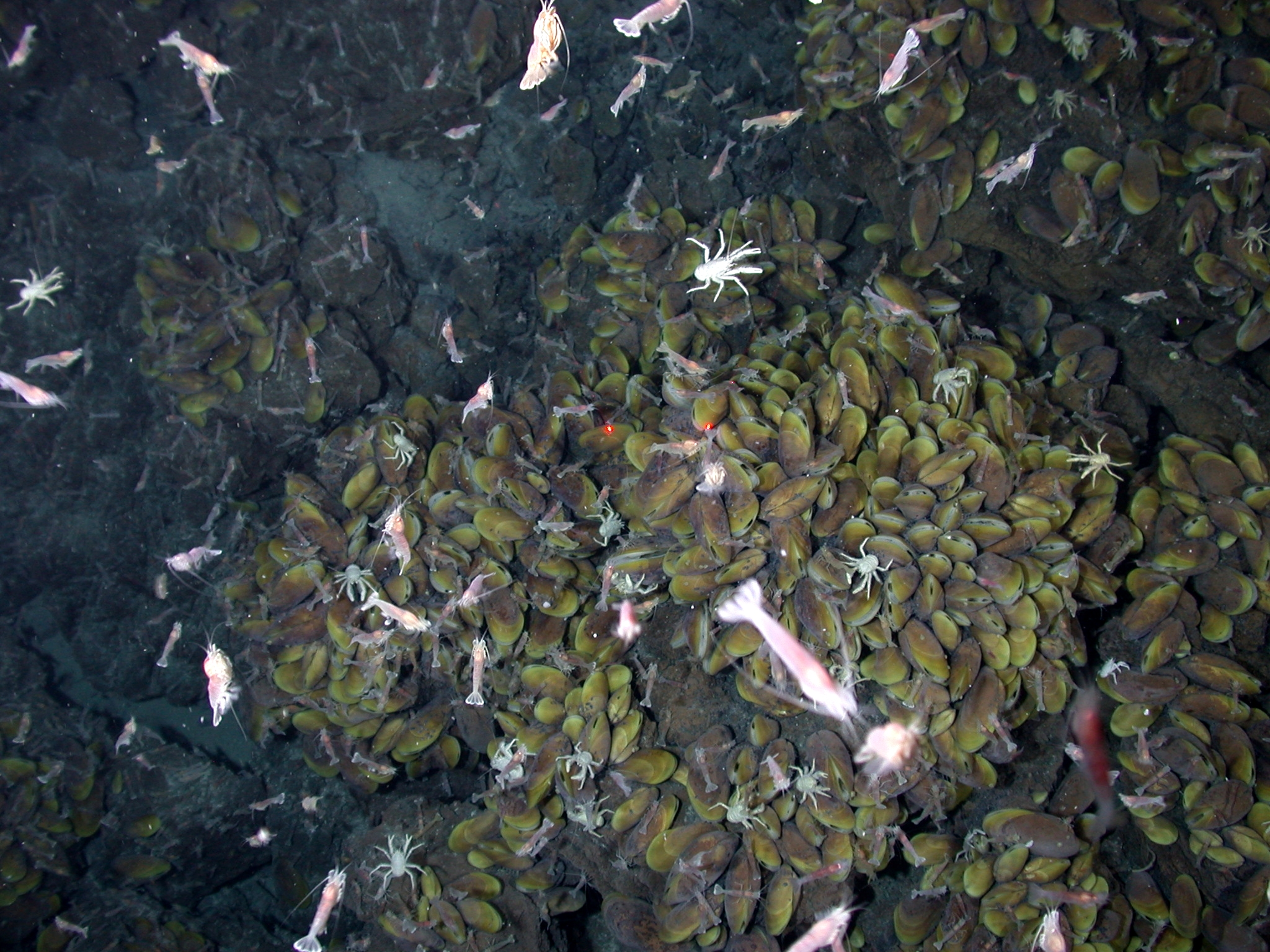
Shrimp (Alvinocaris), a few squat lobsters, and hundreds of bivalves (Bathymodiolus)

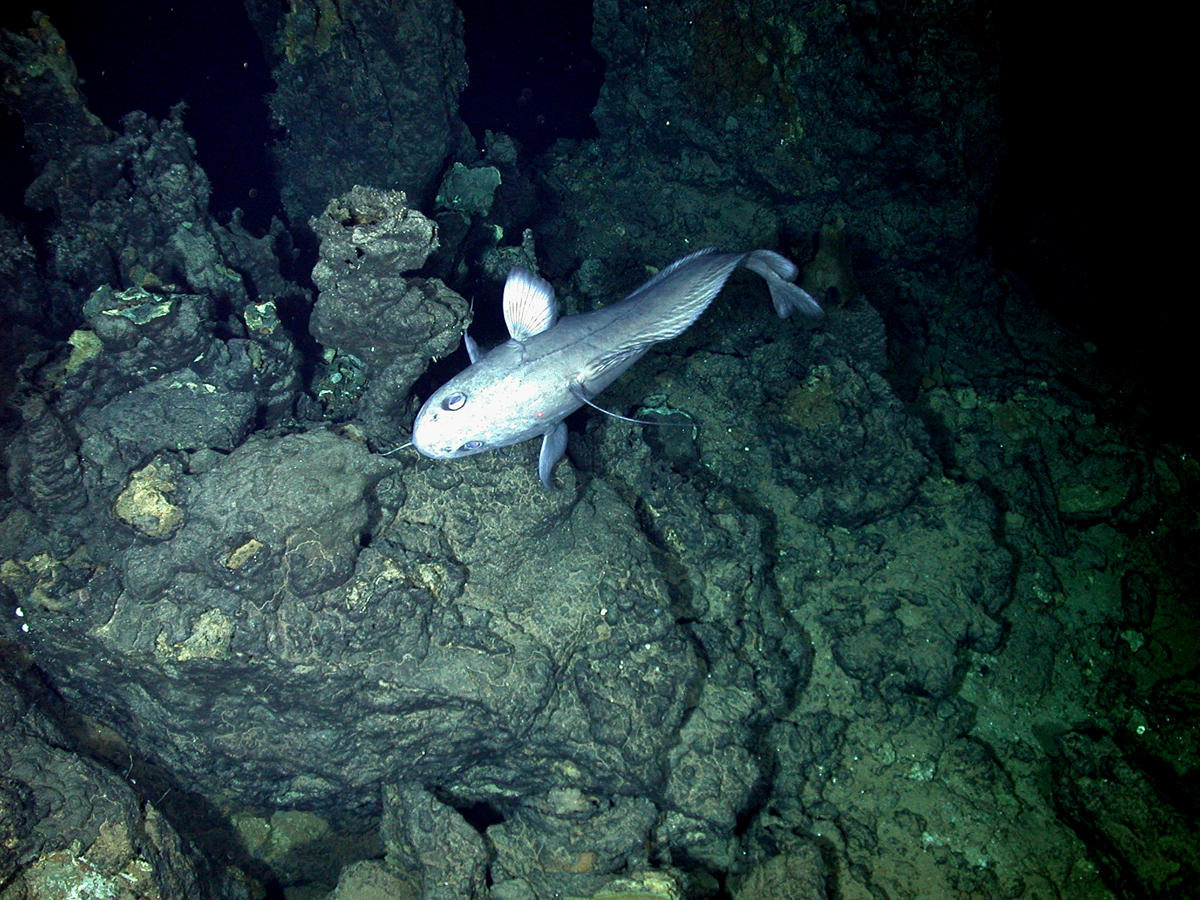
A Macrouridae next to an extinct smoker

=== Animal-bacterial symbiosis ===
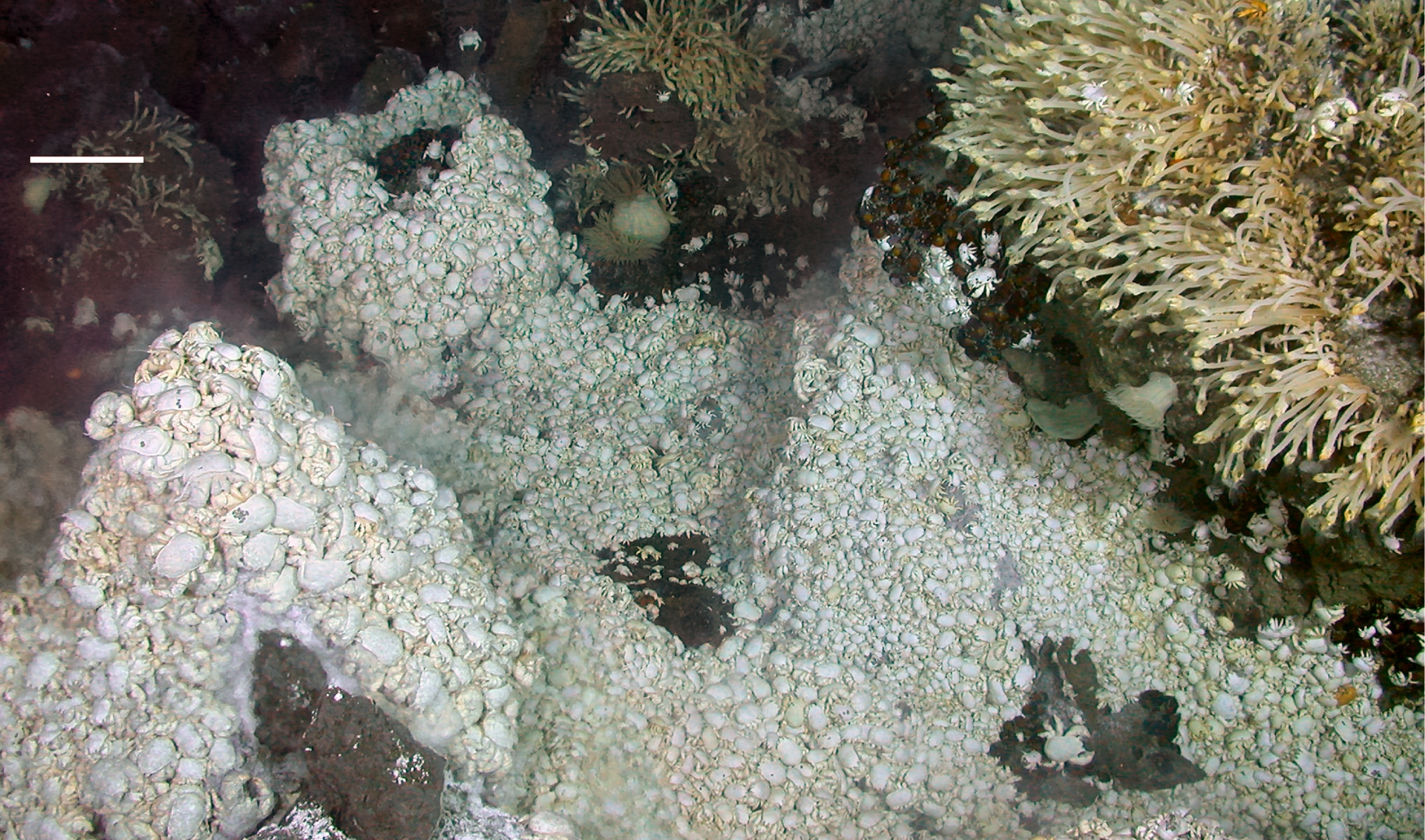
A dense fauna (Kiwa anomurans and Vulcanolepas-like stalked barnacles) near East Scotia Ridge vents

Hydrothermal vent ecosystems have enormous biomass and productivity, but this rests on the symbiotic relationships that have evolved at vents. Deep-sea hydrothermal vent ecosystems differ from their shallow-water and terrestrial hydrothermal counterparts due to the symbiosis that occurs between macroinvertebrate hosts and chemoautotrophic microbial symbionts in the former. Since sunlight does not reach deep-sea hydrothermal vents, organisms in deep-sea hydrothermal vents cannot obtain energy from the sun to perform photosynthesis. Instead, the microbial life found at hydrothermal vents is chemosynthetic; they fix carbon by using energy from chemicals such as sulfide, as opposed to light energy from the sun. In other words, the symbiont converts inorganic molecules (H_{2}S, CO_{2}, O) to organic molecules that the host then uses as nutrition. However, sulfide is an extremely toxic substance to most life on Earth. For this reason, scientists were astounded when they first found hydrothermal vents teeming with life in 1977. What was discovered was the ubiquitous symbiosis of chemoautotrophs living in (endosymbiosis) the vent animals' gills; the reason why multicellular life is capable to survive the toxicity of vent systems. Scientists are therefore now studying how the microbial symbionts aid in sulfide detoxification (therefore allowing the host to survive the otherwise toxic conditions). Work on microbiome function shows that host-associated microbiomes are also important in host development, nutrition, defense against predators, and detoxification. In return, the host provides the symbiont with chemicals required for chemosynthesis, such as carbon, sulfide, and oxygen.

In the early stages of studying life at hydrothermal vents, there were differing theories regarding the mechanisms by which multicellular organisms were able to acquire nutrients from these environments, and how they were able to survive in such extreme conditions. In 1977, it was hypothesized that the chemoautotrophic bacteria at hydrothermal vents might be responsible for contributing to the diet of suspension-feeding bivalves.

Finally, in 1981, it was understood that giant tubeworm nutrition acquisition occurred as a result of chemoautotrophic bacterial endosymbionts. As scientists continued to study life at hydrothermal vents, it was understood that symbiotic relationships between chemoautotrophs and macrofauna invertebrate species was ubiquitous. For instance, in 1983, clam gill tissue was confirmed to contain bacterial endosymbionts; in 1984 vent bathymodiolid mussels and vesicomyid clams were also found to carry endosymbionts.

However, the mechanisms by which organisms acquire their symbionts differ, as do the metabolic relationships. For instance, tubeworms have no mouth and no gut, but they do have a "trophosome", which is where they deal with nutrition and where their endosymbionts are found. They also have a bright red plume, which they use to uptake compounds such as O, H_{2}S, and CO_{2}, which feed the endosymbionts in their trophosome. Remarkably, the tubeworms hemoglobin (which incidentally is the reason for the bright red color of the plume) is capable of carrying oxygen without interference or inhibition from sulfide, despite the fact that oxygen and sulfide are typically very reactive. In 2005, it was discovered that this is possible due to zinc ions that bind the hydrogen sulfide in the tubeworms hemoglobin, therefore preventing the sulfide from reacting with the oxygen. It also reduces the tubeworms tissue from exposure to the sulfide and provides the bacteria with the sulfide to perform chemoautotrophy. It has also been discovered that tubeworms can metabolize CO_{2} in two different ways, and can alternate between the two as needed as environmental conditions change.

In 1988, research confirmed thiotrophic (sulfide-oxidizing) bacteria in Alviniconcha hessleri, a large vent mollusk. In order to circumvent the toxicity of sulfide, mussels first convert it to thiosulfate before carrying it over to the symbionts. In the case of motile organisms such as alvinocarid shrimp, they must track oxic (oxygen-rich) / anoxic (oxygen-poor) environments as they fluctuate in the environment.

Organisms living at the edge of hydrothermal vent fields, such as pectinid scallops, also carry endosymbionts in their gills, and as a result their bacterial density is low relative to organisms living nearer to the vent. However, the scallop's dependence on the microbial endosymbiont for obtaining their nutrition is therefore also lessened.

Furthermore, not all host animals have endosymbionts; some have episymbionts—symbionts living on the animal as opposed to inside the animal. Shrimp found at vents in the Mid-Atlantic Ridge were once thought of as an exception to the necessity of symbiosis for macroinvertebrate survival at vents. That changed in 1988 when they were discovered to carry episymbionts. Since then, other organisms at vents have been found to carry episymbionts as well, such as Lepetodrilis fucensis.

Furthermore, while some symbionts reduce sulfur compounds, others are known as "methanotrophs" and reduce carbon compounds, namely methane. Bathmodiolid mussels are an example of a host that contains methanotrophic endosymbionts; however, the latter mostly occur in cold seeps as opposed to hydrothermal vents.

While chemosynthesis occurring at the deep ocean allows organisms to live without sunlight in the immediate sense, they technically still rely on the sun for survival, since oxygen in the ocean is a byproduct of photosynthesis. However, if the sun were to suddenly disappear and photosynthesis ceased to occur on our planet, life at the deep-sea hydrothermal vents could continue for millennia (until the oxygen was depleted).

=== Theory of hydrothermal origin of life ===
The chemical and thermal dynamics in hydrothermal vents makes such environments highly suitable thermodynamically for chemical evolution processes to take place. Therefore, thermal energy flux is a permanent agent and is hypothesized to have contributed to the evolution of the planet, including prebiotic chemistry.

Günter Wächtershäuser proposed the iron-sulfur world theory and suggested that life might have originated at hydrothermal vents. Wächtershäuser proposed that an early form of metabolism predated genetics. By metabolism he meant a cycle of chemical reactions that release energy in a form that can be harnessed by other processes.

It has been proposed that amino acid synthesis could have occurred deep in the Earth's crust and that these amino acids were subsequently shot up along with hydrothermal fluids into cooler waters, where lower temperatures and the presence of clay minerals would have fostered the formation of peptides and protocells. This is an attractive hypothesis because of the abundance of CH_{4} (methane) and NH_{3} (ammonia) present in hydrothermal vent regions, a condition that was not provided by the Earth's primitive atmosphere. A major limitation to this hypothesis is the lack of stability of organic molecules at high temperatures, but some have suggested that life would have originated outside of the zones of highest temperature. There are numerous species of extremophiles and other organisms currently living immediately around deep-sea vents, suggesting that this is indeed a possible scenario.

Experimental research and computer modeling indicate that the surfaces of mineral particles inside hydrothermal vents have similar catalytic properties to enzymes and are able to create simple organic molecules, such as methanol (CH_{3}OH) and formic acid (HCO_{2}H), out of the dissolved CO_{2} in the water. Additionally, the discovery of supercritical CO_{2} at some sites has been used to further support the theory of hydrothermal origin of life given that it can increase organic reaction rates. Its high solvation power and diffusion rate allow it to promote amino and formic acid synthesis, as well as the synthesis of other organic compounds, polymers, and the four amino acids: alanine, arginine, aspartic acid, and glycine. In situ experiments have revealed the convergence of high N_{2} content and supercritical CO_{2} at some sites, as well as evidence for complex organic material (amino acids) within supercritical CO_{2} bubbles. Proponents of this theory for the origin of life also propose the presence of supercritical CO_{2} as a solution to the "water paradox" that pervades theories on the origin of life in aquatic settings. This paradox encompasses the fact that water is both required for life and will, in abundance, hydrolyze organic molecules and prevent dehydration synthesis reactions necessary to chemical and biological evolution. Supercritical CO_{2}, being hydrophobic, acts as a solvent that facilitates an environment conducive to dehydration synthesis. Therefore, it has been hypothesized that the presence of supercritical CO_{2} in Hadean hydrothermal vents played an important role in the origin of life.

There is some evidence that links the origin of life to alkaline hydrothermal vents in particular. The pH conditions of these vents may have made them more suitable for emerging life. One current theory is that the naturally occurring proton gradients at these deep sea vents supplemented the lack of phospholipid bilayer membranes and proton pumps in early organisms, allowing ion gradients to form despite the lack of cellular machinery and components present in modern cells. There is some discourse around this topic. It has been argued that the natural pH gradients of these vents playing a role in the origin of life is actually implausible. The counter argument relies, among other points, on what the author describes as the unlikelihood of the formation of machinery which produces energy from the pH gradients found in hydrothermal vents without/before the existence of genetic information. This counterpoint has been responded to by Nick Lane, one of the researchers whose work it focuses on. He argues that the counterpoint largely misinterprets both his work and the work of others.

Another reason that the view of deep sea hydrothermal vents as an ideal environment for the origin of life remains controversial is the absence of wet-dry cycles and exposure to UV light, which promote the formation of membranous vesicles and synthesis of many biomolecules. The ionic concentrations of hydrothermal vents differs from the intracellular fluid within the majority of life. It has instead been suggested that terrestrial freshwater environments are more likely to be an ideal environment for the formation of early cells. Meanwhile, proponents of the deep sea hydrothermal vent hypothesis suggest thermophoresis in mineral cavities to be an alternative compartment for polymerization of biopolymers.

How thermophoresis within mineral cavities could promote coding and metabolism is unknown. Nick Lane suggests that nucleotide polymerization at high concentrations of nucleotides within self-replicating protocells, where "Molecular crowding and phosphorylation in such confined, high-energy protocells could potentially promote the polymerization of nucleotides to form RNA". Acetyl phosphate could possibly promote polymerization at mineral surfaces or at low water activity. A computational simulation shows that nucleotide concentration of nucleotide catalysis of "the energy currency pathway is favored, as energy is limiting; favoring this pathway feeds forward into a greater nucleotide synthesis". Fast nucleotide catalysis of CO_{2} fixation lowers nucleotide concentration as protocell growth and division is rapid which then leads to halving of nucleotide concentration, weak nucleotide catalysis of CO_{2} fixation promotes little to protocell growth and division.

In biochemistry, reactions with CO_{2} and H_{2} produce precursors to biomolecules that are also produced from the acetyl-CoA pathway and Krebs cycle which would support an origin of life at deep sea alkaline vents. Acetyl phosphate produced from the reactions are capable of phosphorylating ADP to ATP, with maximum synthesis occurring at high water activity and low concentrations of ions, the Hadean ocean likely had lower concentrations of ions than modern oceans. The concentrations of Mg^{2+} and Ca^{2+} at alkaline hydrothermal systems are lower than those at the ocean. The high concentration of potassium within most life forms could be readily explained that protocells might have evolved sodium-hydrogen antiporters to pump out Na^{+} as prebiotic lipid membranes are less permeable to Na^{+} than H^{+}. If cells originated at these environments, they would have been autotrophs with a Wood-Ljungdahl pathway and incomplete reverse Krebs cycle. Mathematical modelling of organic synthesis of carboxylic acids to lipids, nucleotides, amino acids, and sugars, and polymerization reactions are favorable at alkaline hydrothermal vents.

=== The Deep Hot Biosphere ===
At the beginning of his 1992 paper The Deep Hot Biosphere, Thomas Gold referred to ocean vents in support of his theory that the lower levels of the earth are rich in living biological material that finds its way to the surface. He further expanded his ideas in the book The Deep Hot Biosphere.

An article on abiogenic hydrocarbon production in the February 2008 issue of Science journal used data from experiments at the Lost City hydrothermal field to report how the abiotic synthesis of low molecular mass hydrocarbons from mantle derived carbon dioxide may occur in the presence of ultramafic rocks, water, and moderate amounts of heat.

== Discovery and exploration ==
In 1949, a deep water survey reported anomalously hot brines in the central portion of the Red Sea. Later work in the 1960s confirmed the presence of hot, 60 °C (140 °F), saline brines and associated metalliferous muds. The hot solutions were emanating from an active subseafloor rift. The highly saline character of the waters was not hospitable to living organisms. The brines and associated muds are currently under investigation as a source of mineable precious and base metals.

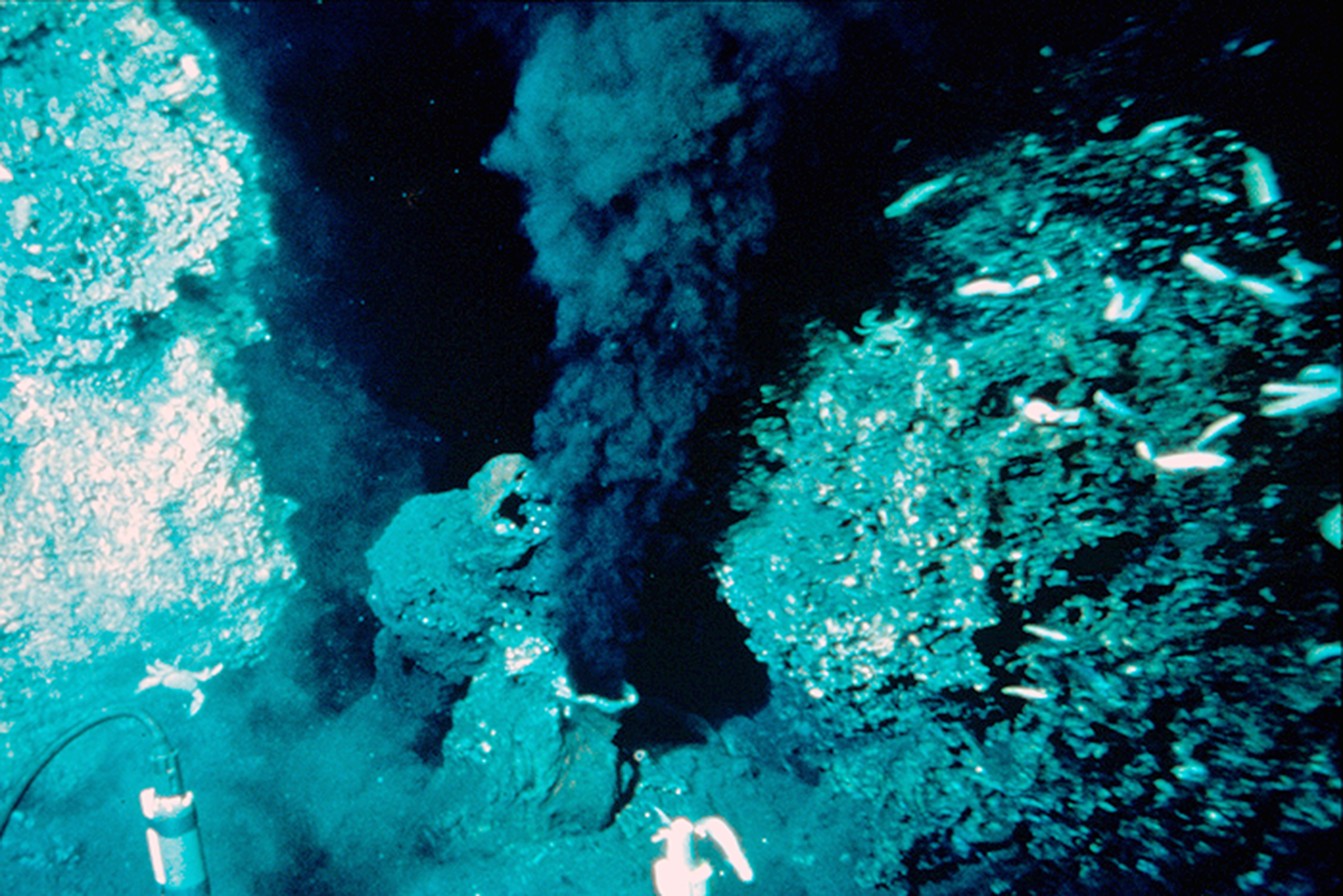
Black smokers were first discovered in 1979 on the East Pacific Rise at 21° north latitude.

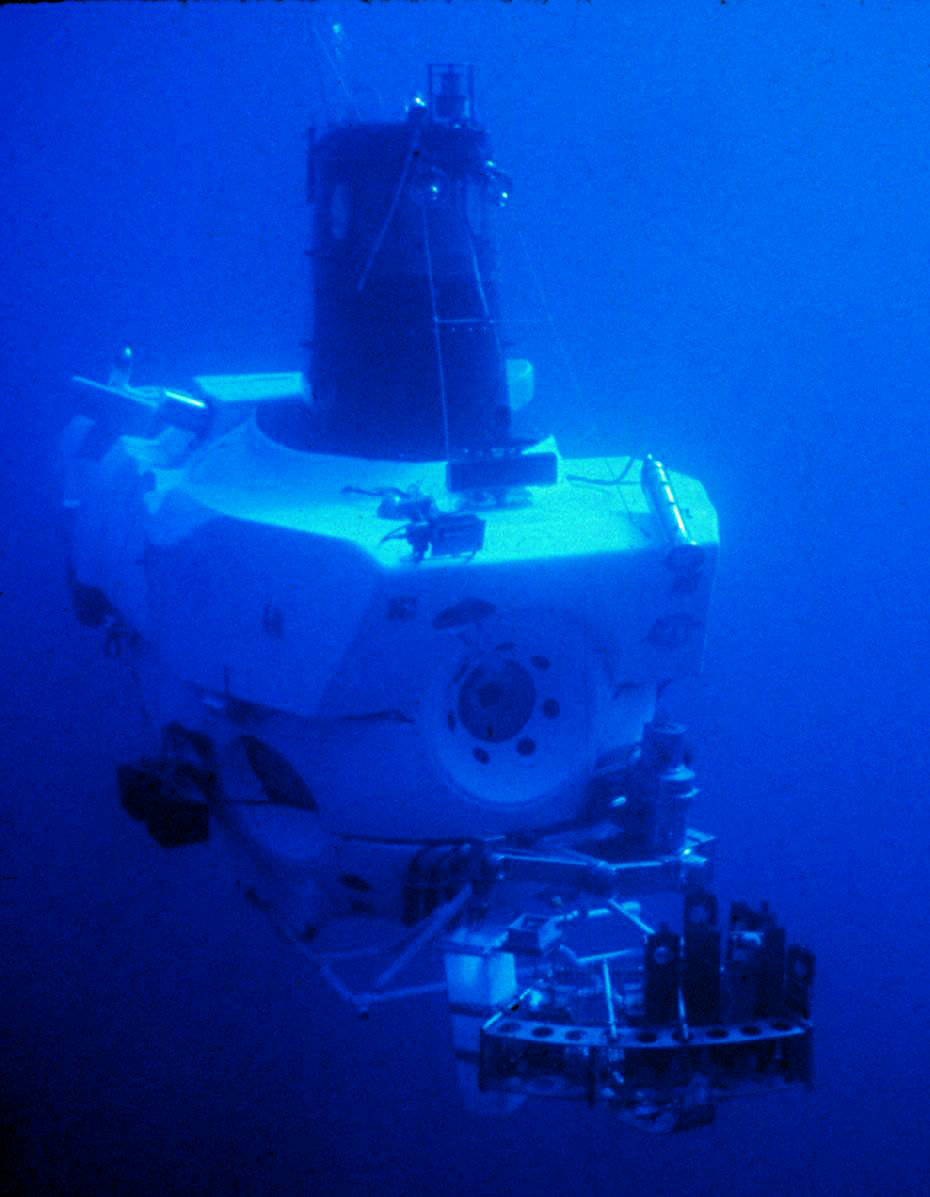
Alvin in 1978, a year after first exploring hydrothermal vents. The rack hanging at the bow holds sample containers.

In June 1976, scientists from the Scripps Institution of Oceanography obtained the first evidence for submarine hydrothermal vents along the Galápagos Rift, a spur of the East Pacific Rise, on the Pleiades II expedition, using the Deep-Tow seafloor imaging system. In 1977, the first scientific papers on hydrothermal vents were published by scientists from the Scripps Institution of Oceanography; research scientist Peter Lonsdale published photographs taken from deep-towed cameras, and PhD student Kathleen Crane published maps and temperature anomaly data. Transponders were deployed at the site, which was nicknamed "Clam-bake", to enable an expedition to return the following year for direct observations with the DSV Alvin.

Chemosynthetic ecosystems surrounding the Galápagos Rift submarine hydrothermal vents were first directly observed in 1977, when a group of marine geologists funded by the National Science Foundation returned to the Clambake sites. The principal investigator for the submersible study was Jack Corliss of Oregon State University. Corliss and Tjeerd van Andel from Stanford University observed and sampled the vents and their ecosystem on February 17, 1977, while diving in the DSV Alvin, a research submersible operated by the Woods Hole Oceanographic Institution (WHOI). Other scientists on the research cruise included Richard (Dick) Von Herzen and Robert Ballard of WHOI, Jack Dymond and Louis Gordon of Oregon State University, John Edmond and Tanya Atwater of the Massachusetts Institute of Technology, Dave Williams of the U.S. Geological Survey, and Kathleen Crane of Scripps Institution of Oceanography. This team published their observations of the vents, organisms, and the composition of the vent fluids in the journal Science. In 1979, a team of biologists led by J. Frederick Grassle, at the time at WHOI, returned to the same location to investigate the biological communities discovered two year earlier.

High temperature hydrothermal vents, the "black smokers", were discovered in spring 1979 by a team from the Scripps Institution of Oceanography using the submersible Alvin. The RISE expedition explored the East Pacific Rise at 21° N with the goals of testing geophysical mapping of the sea floor with the Alvin and finding another hydrothermal field beyond the Galápagos Rift vents. The expedition was led by Fred Spiess and Ken Macdonald and included participants from the U.S., Mexico and France. The dive region was selected based on the discovery of sea floor mounds of sulfide minerals by the French CYAMEX expedition in 1978. Prior to dive operations, expedition member Robert Ballard located near-bottom water temperature anomalies using a deeply towed instrument package. The first dive was targeted at one of those anomalies. On Easter Sunday April 15, 1979 during a dive of Alvin to 2,600 meters, Roger Larson and Bruce Luyendyk found a hydrothermal vent field with a biological community similar to the Galápagos vents. On a subsequent dive on April 21, William Normark and Thierry Juteau discovered the high temperature vents emitting black mineral particle jets from chimneys; the black smokers. Following this Macdonald and Jim Aiken rigged a temperature probe to Alvin to measure the water temperature at the black smoker vents. This observed the highest temperatures then recorded at deep sea hydrothermal vents (380±30 °C). Analysis of black smoker material and the chimneys that fed them revealed that iron sulfide precipitates are the common minerals in the "smoke" and walls of the chimneys.

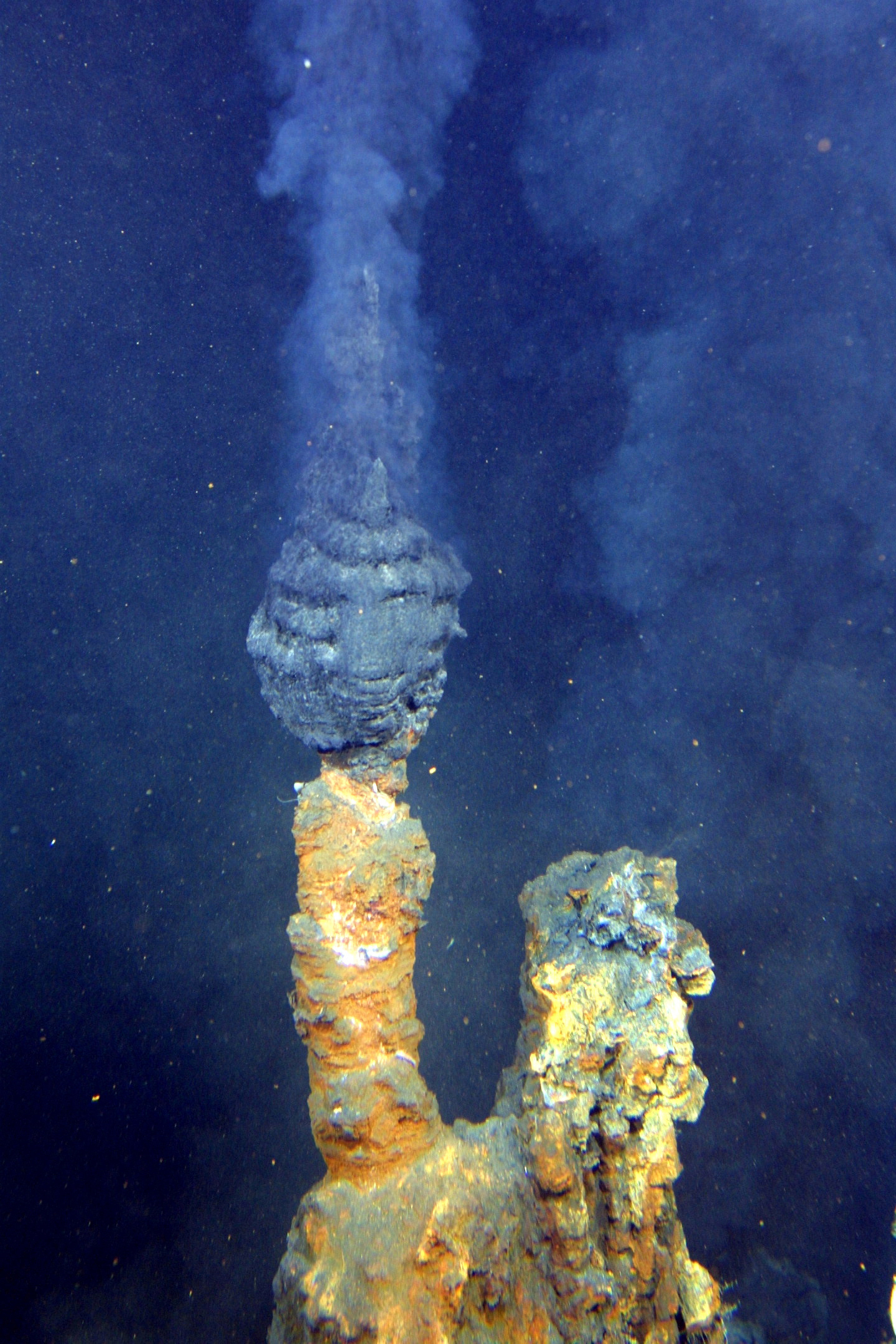
A black smoker known as The Brothers

In 2005, Neptune Resources NL, a mineral exploration company, applied for and was granted 35,000 km^{2} of exploration rights over the Kermadec Arc in New Zealand's Exclusive Economic Zone to explore for seafloor massive sulfide deposits, a potential new source of lead-zinc-copper sulfides formed from modern hydrothermal vent fields. The discovery of a vent in the Pacific Ocean offshore of Costa Rica, named the Medusa hydrothermal vent field (after the serpent-haired Medusa of Greek mythology), was announced in April 2007. The Ashadze hydrothermal field (13°N on the Mid-Atlantic Ridge, elevation -4200 m) was the deepest known high-temperature hydrothermal field until 2010, when a hydrothermal plume emanating from the Beebe site (18°33′N 81°43′W, elevation -5000 m) was detected by a group of scientists from NASA Jet Propulsion Laboratory and Woods Hole Oceanographic Institution. This site is located on the 110 km long, ultraslow spreading Mid-Cayman Rise within the Cayman Trough. In early 2013, the deepest known hydrothermal vents were discovered in the Caribbean Sea at a depth of almost 5,000 metres (16,000 ft).

Oceanographers are studying the volcanoes and hydrothermal vents of the Juan de Fuca mid ocean ridge where tectonic plates are moving away from each other.

Hydrothermal vents and other geothermal manifestations are currently being explored in the Bahía de Concepción, Baja California Sur, Mexico.

== Distribution ==
Hydrothermal vents are distributed along the Earth's plate boundaries, although they may also be found at intra-plate locations such as hotspot volcanoes. As of 2009 there were approximately 500 known active submarine hydrothermal vent fields, with about half visually observed at the seafloor and the other half suspected from water column indicators and/or seafloor deposits.

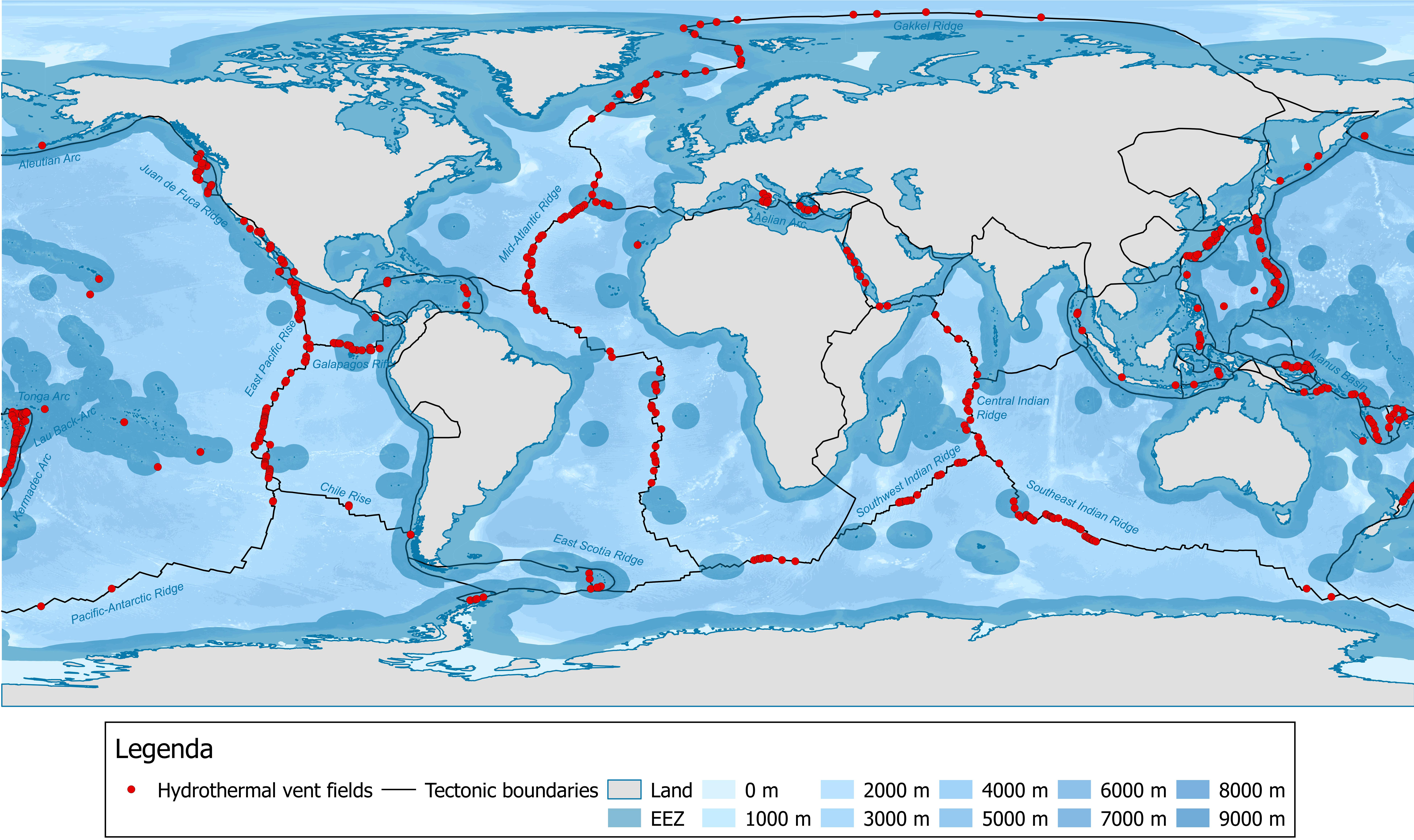
Distribution of hydrothermal vents

Rogers et al. (2012) recognized at least 11 biogeographic provinces of hydrothermal vent systems:

1. Mid-Atlantic Ridge province,
2. East Scotia Ridge province,
3. northern East Pacific Rise province,
4. central East Pacific Rise province,
5. southern East Pacific Rise province,
6. south of the Easter Microplate,
7. Indian Ocean province,
8. four provinces in the western Pacific and many more.

== Exploitation ==
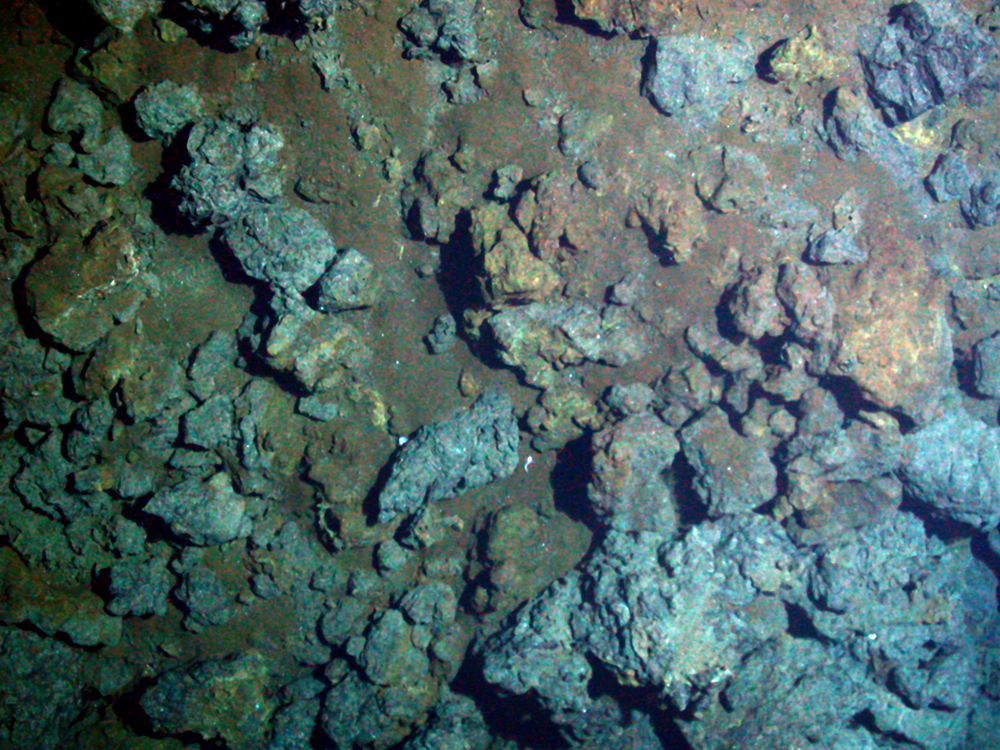
Hydrothermal fluids contain dissolved minerals that cool and react with seawater and then precipitate as sediment on the surrounding seabed.

Hydrothermal vents, in some instances, have led to the formation of exploitable mineral resources via the deposition of seafloor massive sulfide deposits. The Mount Isa orebody, located in Queensland, Australia, is an excellent example. Many hydrothermal vents are rich in cobalt, gold, copper, and rare earth metals essential for electronic components. Hydrothermal venting on the Archean seafloor is considered to have formed Algoma-type banded iron formations, which have been a source of iron ore.

Recently, mineral exploration companies, driven by the elevated price activity in the base metals sector during the mid-2000s, have turned their attention to the extraction of mineral resources from hydrothermal fields on the seafloor. Significant cost reductions are, in theory, possible.

In countries such as Japan, where mineral resources are primarily derived from international imports, there is a particular push for the extraction of seafloor mineral resources. The world's first "large-scale" mining of hydrothermal vent mineral deposits was carried out by Japan Oil, Gas and Metals National Corporation (JOGMEC) in August – September, 2017. JOGMEC carried out this operation using the Research Vessel Hakurei. This mining was carried out at the 'Izena hole/cauldron' vent field within the hydrothermally active back-arc basin known as the Okinawa Trough, which contains 15 confirmed vent fields according to the InterRidge Vents Database.

Two companies are currently engaged in the late stages of commencing to mine seafloor massive sulfides (SMS). Nautilus Minerals is in the advanced stages of commencing extraction from its Solwarra deposit, in the Bismarck Archipelago, and Neptune Minerals is at an earlier stage with its Rumble II West deposit, located on the Kermadec Arc, near the Kermadec Islands. Both companies are proposing using modified existing technology. Nautilus Minerals, in partnership with Placer Dome (now part of Barrick Gold), succeeded in 2006 in returning over 10 metric tons of mined SMS to the surface using modified drum cutters mounted on an ROV, a world first. Neptune Minerals in 2007 succeeded in recovering SMS sediment samples using a modified oil industry suction pump mounted on an ROV, also a world first.

Potential seafloor mining has environmental impacts, including dust plumes from mining machinery affecting filter-feeding organisms, collapsing or reopening vents, methane clathrate release, or even sub-oceanic land slides.

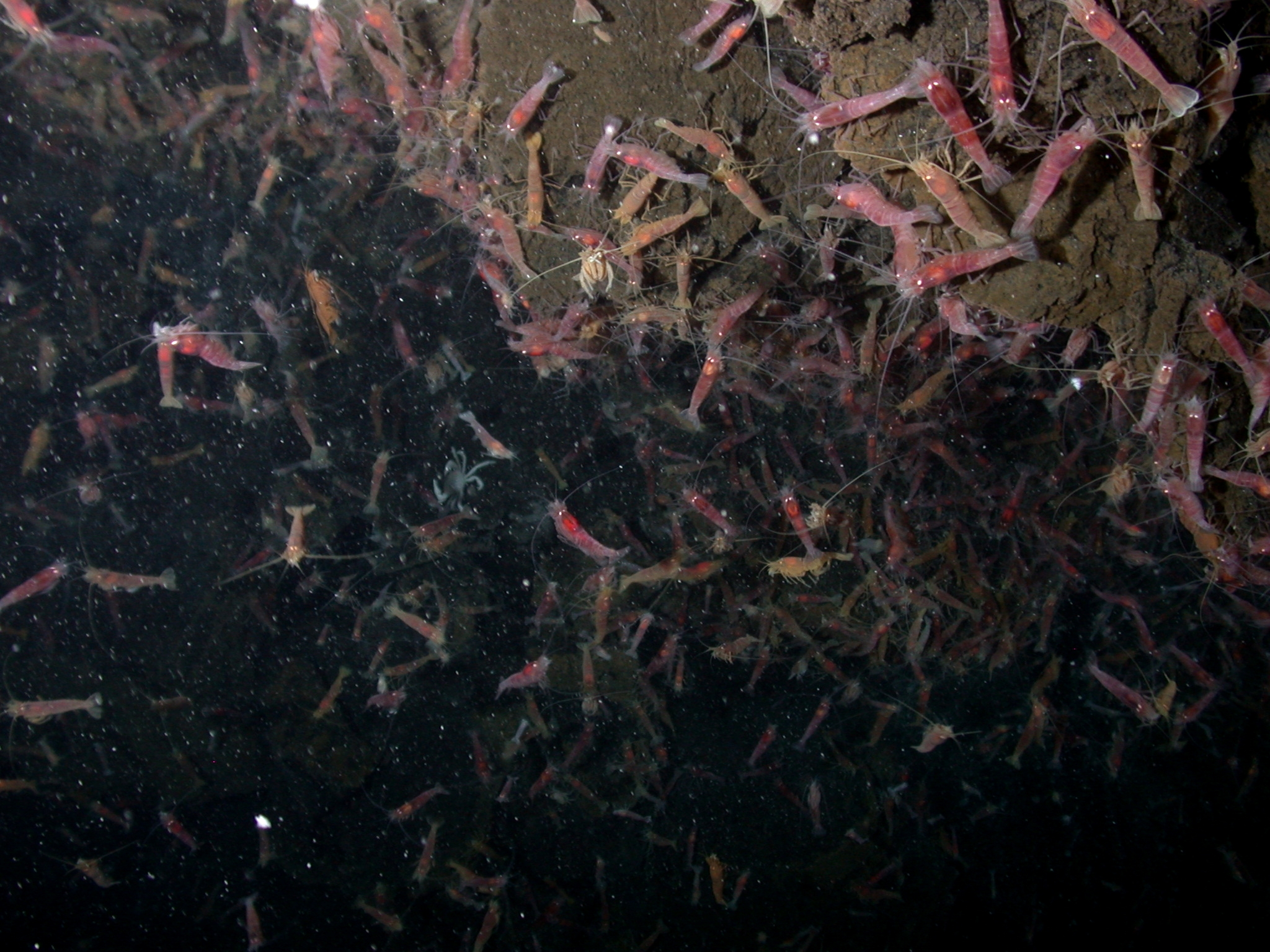
A swarm of shrimp from the genus Alvinocaris near a vent in the Pacific Ring of Fire

There are also potential environmental effects from the tools needed for mining these hydrothermal vent ecosystems, including noise pollution and anthropogenic light. Hydrothermal vent system mining would require the use of both submerged mining tools on the seafloor, including remotely operated underwater vehicles (ROVs), as well as surface support vessels on the ocean surface. Inevitably, through the operation of these machines, some level of noise will be created, which presents a problem for hydrothermal vent organisms because, as they are up to 12,000 feet below the surface of the ocean, they experience very little sound. As a result of this, these organisms have evolved to have highly sensitive hearing organs, so if there is a sudden increase in noise, such as that created by mining machinery, there is potential to damage these auditory organs and harm the vent organisms. It is also important to consider that many studies have been able to show that a large percent of benthic organisms communicate using very low-frequency sounds; therefore, increasing ambient noise levels on the seafloor could potentially mask communication between the organisms and alter behavioral patterns. Similar to how deep-sea SMS mining tools create noise pollution, they also create anthropogenic light sources on the seafloor (from mining tools) and the ocean surface (from surface support vessels). Organisms at these hydrothermal vent systems are in the aphotic zone of the ocean and have adapted to very low light conditions. Studies on deep sea shrimp have shown the potential for flood lights used on the sea floor used in studying the vent systems to cause permanent retinal damage, warranting further research into the potential risk to other vent organisms. On top of the risk presented to deep-sea organisms, the surface support vessels use nocturnal anthropogenic lighting. Research has shown that this type of lighting on the ocean surface can disorient seabirds and cause fallout, where they fly toward the anthropogenic light and become exhausted or collide with man-made objects, resulting in injury or death. There is consideration for both aquatic and land organisms when evaluating the environmental effects of hydrothermal vent mining.

There are three mining waste processes, known as the side cast sediment release, dewatering process, and sediment shift or disturbance, that would be expected with the deep-sea mining processes and could result in the accumulation of a sediment plume or cloud, which can have substantial environmental implications. The side cast sediment release is a process that would occur at the seafloor and would involve the move of material at the seafloor by the submerged ROV's and would most likely contribute to the formation of sediment plumes at the seafloor. The idea of side cast release is that the ROV's would discard economically invaluable material to the side of the mining sight before transporting the sulfide material to the supporting vessel at the surface. The goal of this process is to reduce the amount of material being transferred to the surface and minimize land-based. The dewatering process is a mining waste process that would most likely contribute to the formation of sediment plumes from the surface. The method of mine waste disposal releases water from the ship that may have been obtained during the extraction and transport of the material from the seafloor to the surface. The third contribution to the formation of the sediment plume or cloud would be sediment disturbance and release. This mining waste contribution is mainly associated with the mining activity on the seafloor associated with the movement of the ROVs and the destructive disturbance of the seafloor as part of the mining process itself.

The two main environmental concerns as a result of these waste mining processes that contribute to the formation of the sediment plume would be the release of heavy metals and increased amounts of sediment released. The release of heavy metals is mainly associated with the dewatering process that would take place on board the ship at the surface of the water. The main problem associated with dewatering is that it is not just the release of seawater re-entering the water column. Heavy metals such as copper and cobalt that would be sourced from the material extracted on the seafloor are also mixed in with the water that is released into the water column. The first environmental concern associated with the release of heavy metals is that it has the potential to change ocean chemistry within that localized water column area. The second concern would be that some of the heavy metals that could be released can have some level of toxicity to not only organisms inhabiting that area but also organisms passing through the mining site area. The concerns surrounding increased sediment release are mainly related to the other two mining waste processes, side cast sediment and seafloor sediment disturbance. The main environmental concern would be the smothering of organisms below as a result of redistributing large amounts of sediment to other areas on the seafloor, which could potentially threaten the population of organisms inhabiting the area. Redistribution of large quantities of sediment can also affect the feeding and gas exchange processes between organisms, posing a serious threat to the population. Finally, these processes can also increase the sedimentation rate on the seafloor, resulting in a predicted minimum of 500 m per every 1–10 km.

A large amount of work is currently being engaged in by both of the above-mentioned companies to ensure that the potential environmental impacts of seafloor mining are well understood and control measures are implemented before exploitation commences. However, this process has been arguably hindered by the disproportionate distribution of research effort among vent ecosystems; the best studied and understood hydrothermal vent ecosystems are not representative of those targeted for mining.

Attempts have been made in the past to exploit minerals from the seafloor. The 1960s and 1970s saw a great deal of activity (and expenditure) in the recovery of manganese nodules from the abyssal plains, with varying degrees of success. This does demonstrate, however, that the recovery of minerals from the seafloor is possible and has been possible for some time. Mining of manganese nodules served as a cover story for the elaborate attempt in 1974 by the CIA to raise the sunken Soviet submarine K-129 using the Glomar Explorer, a ship purpose-built for the task by Howard Hughes. The operation was known as Project Azorian, and the cover story of seafloor mining of manganese nodules may have served as the impetus to propel other companies to make the attempt.

== Conservation ==
The conservation of hydrothermal vents has been the subject of sometimes heated discussion in the oceanographic community for the last 20 years. It has been pointed out that it may be that those causing the most damage to these fairly rare habitats are scientists. There have been attempts to forge agreements over the behaviour of scientists investigating vent sites, but, although there is an agreed code of practice, there is no formal international and legally binding agreement.

Mineral extraction

A key talking point surrounding the conservation of hydrothermal vent ecosystems is deep sea mining. There are four main mineral resources that are under consideration for commercial extraction: manganese nodules, cobalt-rich crusts, Seafloor massive sulfide deposits and phosphorite nodules. Seafloor massive sulfide depositions surrounding hydrothermal vents are a central area of discussion. As discussed above, black smokers produce an abundance of sulfides primarily through the production of Iron Sulfides, namely Pyrite. This sulfide production leads to high sulfide deposition local to many black smokers. Central to the conservation conversation, is weighing the possibilities for sustainable use of newly harvested sulfide against the effects of commercially attaining this sulfide via deep sea mining.

The effects of commercially extracting deep sea minerals are largely unknown due to the extremely dynamic nature of a hydrothermal vents ecosystem. Mining of an active deep sea hydrothermal vent ecosystem would depend on the recolonization of chemosynthetic bacteria, and therefore the continuation of the hydrothermal vent fluid as it is the main hydrothermal energy source. It is very difficult to get an idea of the effects of mining on the hydrothermal vent fluid because there have been no large scale studies done. However, there have been studies on the recolonization of these vent ecosystems after volcanic destruction. From these we can develop insight on the potential effects of mining destruction, and have learned it took 3–5 years for bacteria to recolonize the area, and around 10 years for megafauna to return. It was also found that there was a shift in the composition of species in the ecosystem compared to before the destruction, and the presence of immigrant species. This shift in biodiversity poses issues to certain critically endangered species that thrive in harsh deep sea environment, like mollusks. Though further research into the effects of sustained seafloor SMS mining on species recolonization is needed. Shallow hydrothermal vents have also been proposed as a potential model for climate change in extreme environments, specifically by tracking changes to highly specialized organisms local to the vent. Major impacts of climate change such as ocean acidification, increasing temperature and heavy metal deposition, on local hydrothermal vent ecosystems are areas of interest for these models. Deep sea mining's impact on efficacy of these models is an area of future interest.

== Geochronological dating ==
Common methods to find out the ages of hydrothermal vents are to date the sulfide (e.g., pyrite) and sulphate minerals (e.g., baryte). Common dating methods include radiometric dating and electron spin resonance dating. Different dating methods have their own limitations, assumptions and challenges. General challenges include the high purity of extracted minerals required for dating, the age range of each dating method, heating above closure temperatures erasing ages of older minerals, and multiple episodes of mineral formation resulting in a mixture of ages. In environments with multiple phases of mineral formation, generally, electron spin resonance dating gives the average age of the bulk mineral while radiometric dates are biased to the ages of younger phases because of the decay of parent nuclei. These explain why different methods can give different ages to the same sample and why the same hydrothermal chimney can have samples with different ages.

== History and formation of hydrothermal vents ==
Although some biogeochemists such as Rogers et al. (2012) have identified sites of hydrothermal vents, the locations of known hydrothermal vent formations in deep sea systems is not well understood. The ocean floor is not well explored, with less than 1% being well known. Most of the hydrothermal vents scientists are currently aware of form along mid ocean ridges. The location of these systems is important to understanding their formation, as most accepted theories revolve around seismic activity, particularly near volcanic regions.

Seismic activity during Paleocene and Eocene continental rifting led to an eruption of gases, liquids, and sediments from the Earth's core. This intrusive event created large craters sitting on top of sills. Sills are layers of igneous rock where magma intrudes between existing layers of stratified rock. These large craters on the seafloor are collections of hydrothermal vents. Distinct features of these vents include inward-dipped sedimentary strata, and sandstone dykes, pipes, and breccias. These features are categorized as subvolcanic intrusions, which lead to hydrothermal activity. A study used 2D seismic reflection data, to characterize the structures of these systems, which are sunken in craters with a funneled side profile. These structures are often referred to as chimneys which form over the surface of the vents. The oceanic crust and the seawater interact to form these systems, and alter the local chemistry and form deposits that are rich in varying metals. The unique depositing of metals and altered local chemistry in turn allow for conditions to support life of thermophiles and other organisms.

== See also ==
- Abiogenesis – Life arising from non-living matter
- Brine pool – Accumulation of brine in a seafloor depression
- Endeavour Hydrothermal Vents – Group of Pacific Ocean hydrothermal vents
- Extremophiles – Organisms capable of living in extreme environments
- Hydrogen sulfide chemosynthesis - system of generating energy used in hydrothermal vents
- Lost City Hydrothermal Field
- Magic Mountain (British Columbia) – Hydrothermal vent field in the northeast Pacific
- 9° North – Region of hydrothermal vents on the East Pacific Rise in the Pacific Ocean
- Pito Seamount – Seamount in the Pacific Ocean north-northwest of Easter Island
- Submarine volcano – Underwater vents or fissures in the Earth's surface from which magma can erupt
- Volcanogenic massive sulfide ore deposit, also known as VMS deposit – Metal sulfide ore deposit
- Deep sea mining
