= Rainbow Vent Field =

System of hydrothermal vents on the Mid-Atlantic Ridge

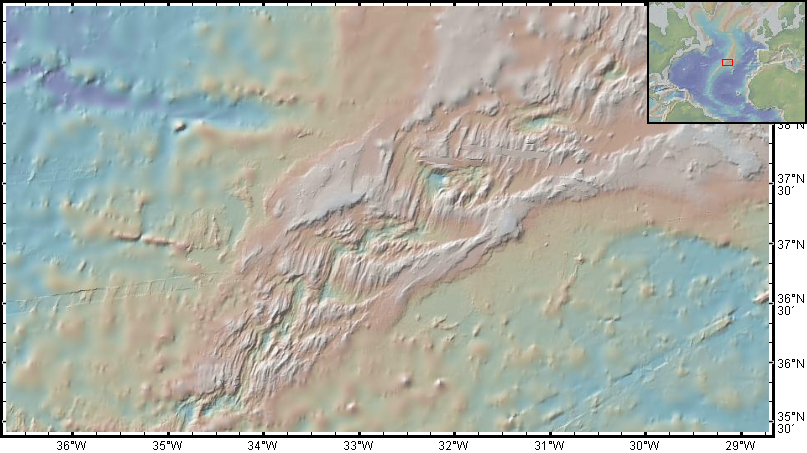
A map of the Azores triple junction. In this image, Rainbow is at 36° 14' N and 34° 5' W.

The Rainbow hydrothermal vent field is a system of ultramafic-hosted hydrothermal vents located at 36°14'N on the Mid-Atlantic Ridge (MAR). It was discovered in 1994 from temperature readings of ten high-temperature black smokers at a depth of approximately 2.3 kilometres (1.4 mi), where fluids can exceed 365 °C (689 °F). The site is shallower and larger in area than many other vent fields along the Azores section of the MAR with an area of 1.5 square kilometres (370 acres). Located 370 km (229.91 mi) southeast of Faial Island, it is a popular geochemical sampling and modeling site due to close proximity to the Azores and definitive representation of serpentinization from hydrothermal circulation and synthesis.

Vent geology, biology, and fluid content make Rainbow comparable to other hot hydrothermal vents of the Azores such as Lucky Strike and Menez Gwen. However; chlorinity, metal concentration, and pH distinguish it from neighboring vent fields. As a hot, ultramafic-hosted vent field, pH levels of fluids are extremely low with much H_{2} and CH_{4} generated from water interactions with mafic igneous rocks.

Though not actively considered for development, Rainbow lies within the MoMAR (Monitoring of the Mid Atlantic Ridge) survey area for a marine observatory.

== Discovery and expeditions ==
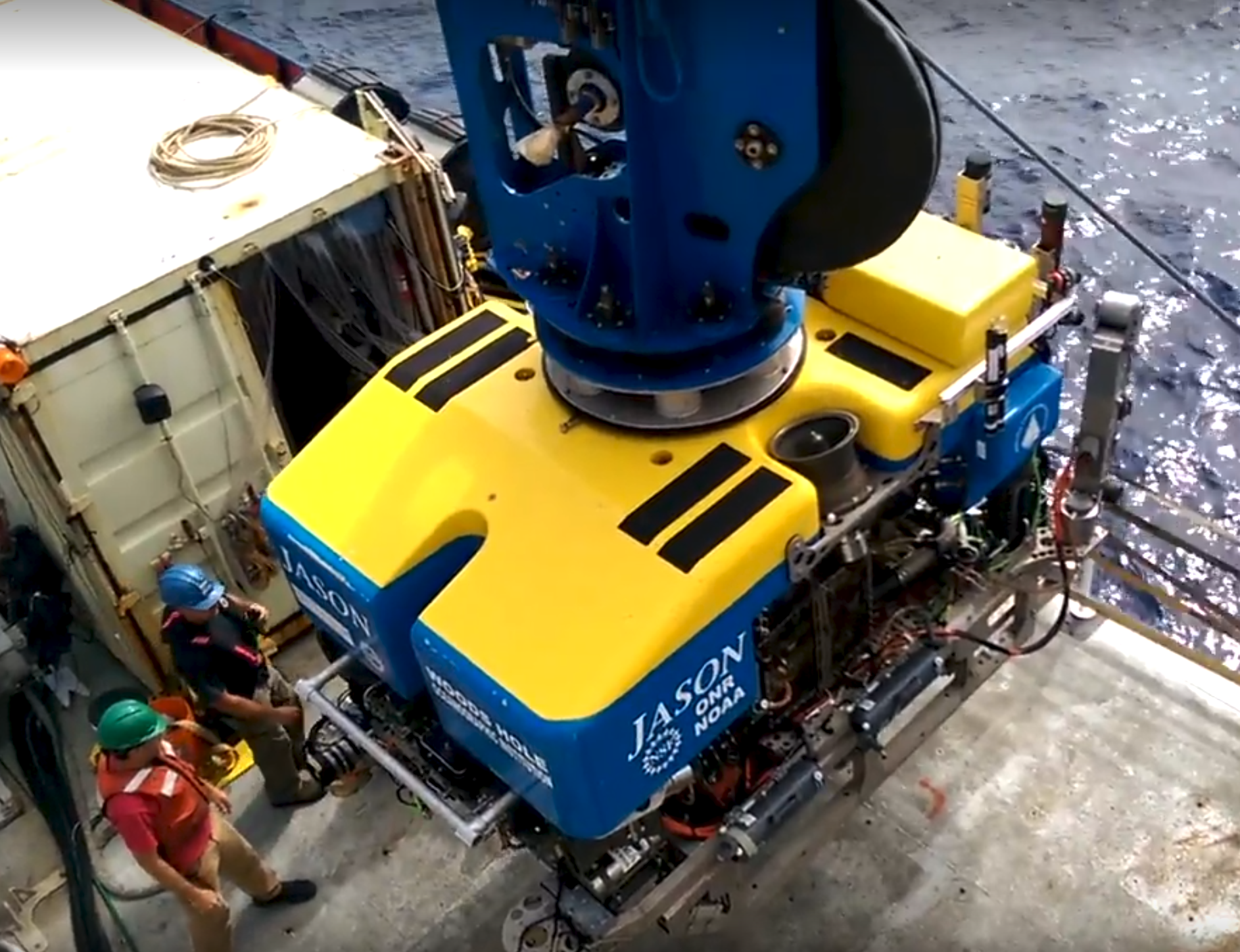
ROV JASON, operated by Woods Hole Oceanographic Institution.

Rainbow has had a number of visits since its initial discovery in 1994. Remotely Operated Vehicles (ROVs), submersibles, and Conductivity Temperature Depth (CTD) probes have been deployed to sample, characterize, and explore the vent field.

- 1994: Rainbow was first identified from TOBI side-scan sonar and CTD data on the HEAT Cruise, which returned bathymetric geomorphology of the Rainbow Massif.
- 1999: Rainbow was visited again by Don Walsh and Anatoly Sagalevich in the MIR submersible.
- 1997: First fluid sampling during the FLORES cruise, also sampling Azores MAR sites Menez Gwen and Lucky Strike.
- 2001: The area was surveyed in greater detail on the IRIS cruise, marking a debut in magnetism, gravimetry, and water sample data from the ROV Victor 6000. Some vent fluid and gas sampling was also performed on the IRIS cruise of 2001.
- 2002: The SEAHMA 1 cruise was conducted to sample geology and biology at the Azores triple junction where the African, Eurasian, and North American plates meet.
- 2007, 2008: On the MoMARDREAM cruises, the ROV Victor and submersible Nautile were used in collecting a variety of geological samples. During the MoMARDREAM cruises, a total of 29 dredges (14 from 2007, 15 in 2008) were collected.
- 2008: Fluid sampling was also performed on the KNOX18RR cruise, with samples collected by the ROV Jason.
- 2009: The first Portuguese journey to the Rainbow massif from the EMEPC/LUSO/2009 Expedition to study Azores vent biology.
- 2012: Trace metals were assessed from numerous field studies of the MAR using the R/V Knorr and ROV Jason II.

== Geologic setting ==
Rainbow is located on a massif at 2,275–2,335 m (7,464–7,661 ft) depth, shared with two fossil (mostly inactive) vent sites Ghost City and Clamstone. As a slow-spreading ridge at approximately 2.2 cm/yr, extensive faulting has uplifted gabbro and peridotite and exposed ultramafic rock to cold seawater. Faulting may also be responsible for magnitude 3 - 3.5 earthquakes observed in hydroacoustic data, suggesting that the region is tectonically active. Unlike high-temperature basalt systems, this ultramafic setting is associated with a positive magnetic anomaly; postulated to come from magnetite precipitation. The active Rainbow site exhibits numerous active and inactive chimneys at serpentinized peridotite outcrops, distinguishable from sediment cover either by protruding from sediment or at a scarp. Chloride concentrations from vent fluids suggest a common heat source for the site, though the location and geometry of heat sources is unknown.

== Hydrothermal circulation ==
Due to the extensive faulting at the Rainbow massif, cold ocean seawater is able to permeate deep into the seafloor. Water circulates down a fault line, actively reacting with various sediment and rock layers until it is warmed by an underlying heat source. When warmed, it can undergo a phase transition - often resulting in dramatic changes to fluid chemistry. Super-heated vent fluids then rise and are ejected from the seafloor, where a dramatic drop in temperature from cold-water mixing can cause some fluid chemicals to precipitate out and form chimneys.

With relatively little basalt within a kilometer of the vent field, most reactions influencing the vent fluids during hydrothermal circulation come from differing degrees of serpentinization and veining of peridotites. Olivine-rich rocks such as troctolites undergo significant alteration, being partially replaced by serpentine and magnetite. There is evidence of high-temperature serpentinite alteration on some samples with pre-existing serpentinite, demonstrating overprinting of serpentinites with higher iron content. Mylonic peridotites at the vent field show plastic deformation then overprinted by serpentine and chlorite.

Rainbow exhibits very acidic vent fluids (pH ~2.8) from hydronium ions released from numerous ultramafic rock interactions during vent circulation. Fluids also contain a number of organic carbon molecules, from alkanes and phenol to complicated polycyclic aromatic hydrocarbons (PAHS) and biogenic fatty acids. These organic carbon molecules suggest organisms living within the vents, harnessing chemosynthetic reactions to metabolize. Serpentinization reactions occur with hydrothermal circulation causing water to react with hot iron-containing minerals, releasing H_{2} gas and transforming the base rock. Serpentinization may also be responsible for a significant amount of methane produced at Rainbow.

Vent fluids are known to travel many kilometers northeast from their associated vents, depositing any unreacted elements to the seafloor far away from their source.

== Phase separation ==
An example of phases for a material. When vent fluids reach a high enough temperature, they may become gaseous and lose chlorine before leaving through a vent chimney.

Phase separation can occur when seawater is heated to a high enough temperature it will form a second phase. At pressure below the critical point (298 bar, 407 °C for seawater), the seawater boils and produces a vapor phase. At pressure above the critical pressure a saline brine forms as the second phase. In the subsurface, gravitational forces can lead the two phases to separate.

Waters circulating deep within Rainbow rise to a high enough pressure or temperature so that they react with the rock and chemical constituents are dissolved into or precipitate out of the vent fluid. Chemical concentrations in the fluid are further modified when it undergoes phase separation because volatile constituents are concentrated in the vapor rich phase and metal ions in the brine. Phase separation carries great significance for chlorine, an abundant element in seawater with few reactions outside of phase separation, and is often normalized to assess thermodynamics within a ridge system. Depending on the chemical stability of the elements, water entering the seafloor will therefore exhibit different chemical characteristics when it comes back out.

At Rainbow, phase separation is a suggested cause for particularly high concentrations of chloride, trace elements, and hydronium, as they differ greatly from similar MAR vents like Logatchev. Furthermore, Rainbow vent fluids have the highest concentrations of many elements found at the Azores vents, such as hydrogen, transition metals, and rare earth elements (REE). Due to the extreme endmember pH, chloride is hypothesized to act as a dominant cation and therefore forms many weak complexes with other elements at high temperatures. These complexes become unstable when pH rises or temperature decreases, therefore releasing many transition metals and REEs.

Observed endmember fluid samples taken at different vent sites are of very similar manganese and magnesium concentrations, which suggests a common heat source for the vents. There may, however, be many heat sources at Rainbow considering the complex faulting tectonics, and extensive amounts of gabbro and peridotite.

== Vent field biology ==
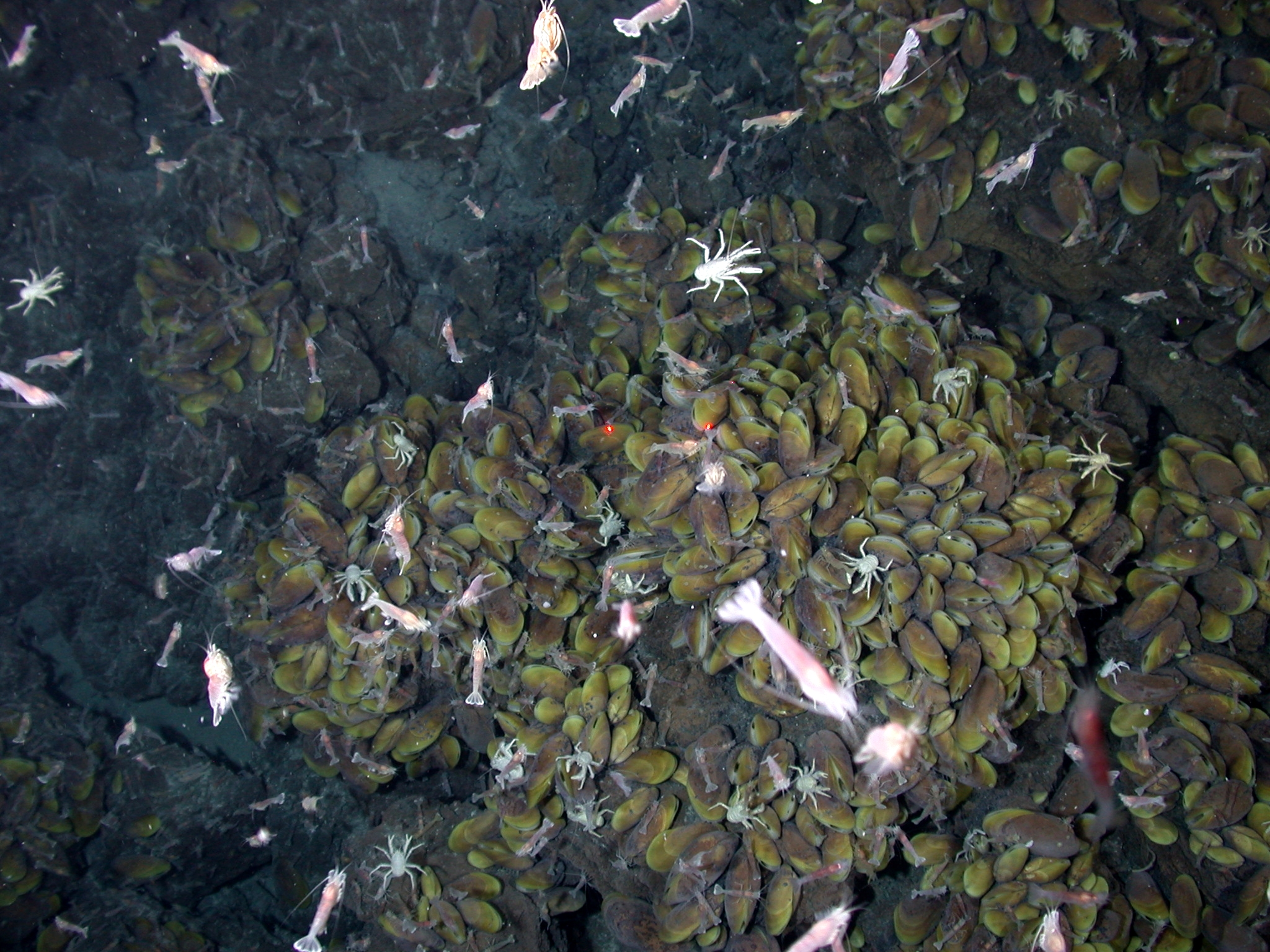
An example of shrimp, crabs and mussels that could be at the Rainbow Vent field.

Rainbow has been a long-lived environment for microbial life, with a great diversity of archaea and bacteria at the vent field. Microbes are known to utilize energy from H_{2} gas and H_{2}S oxidation, with some chemotrophs belonging to the Asgard archaea tree. The Asgard archaea are a very recent discovery with a theorized ancestry in evolution between prokaryotes and eukaryotes.

Some of the biogenic alkanes found within vent fluids are suggestive of sulfide-oxidizing bacteria or archaea. However, there is also abundant evidence of abiotic production of organic and inorganic molecules at Rainbow, such as methane and carbonate, which may have been supportive of early life. Due to the hot temperatures, low pH, and longevity of the vent activity, there is a strong case for life to originate at sites similar to the Rainbow Massif.

Regarding macrofauna, the Rainbow Massif has been supportive of many kinds of decapods and mollusks, such as Alvinocarididae and Bathymodiolus respectively, feeding where nutrient-rich vent fluids interact with the cold bathypelagic waters. Rainbow exhibits fossils of many kinds of vesicomyid and thyasirid shells. Fossils have been dated at other sites on the Rainbow massif, with Ghost City containing gastropod and clam remains that are aged at nearly 111,000 years old. Shell-rich carbonates have been found at Clamstone, which may be as old as 25,000 years.

== Human uses and preservation ==
Rainbow, as with all other deepwater vent systems, is a location of highly specialized biology and sensitive geological structures. Due to its significance as an accessible and examplar ultramafic system, Rainbow is a very popular site for scientific expeditions involving intrusive long-term monitoring, environmental manipulation, and geological sampling. It is also the only vent field on the MAR which has been visited by tourists. Due to some veining processes, ore extraction and mining are another activity than may upset ecosystems of the massif.

Rainbow has a tricky history regarding preservation, as the site is within the OSPAR Maritime Area and just outside of Portugal's exclusive economic zone similarly to another vent field, Saldanha. Portugal was unable to distinguish Rainbow as residing off of the extended Azores shelf region - therefore rendering it unqualified for OSPAR protection as a High Seas location. The World Wide Fund for Nature (WWF) lobbied for Rainbow's protection in 2005 and as of 2006, Rainbow is listed by OSPAR as protected marine nature preserve with an MPA size of 22.15 km^{2}.

== See also ==
- Hydrothermal vent
- Loki's Castle
- Endeavor Hydrothermal Vents
- Lost City Hydrothermal Field
