= Pito Seamount =

Seamount in the Pacific Ocean north-northwest of Easter Island

Coordinates: 23°19.65′S 111°38.41′W

Pito Seamount is a seamount in the Pacific Ocean. It rises to a depth of 2,250 metres (7,380 ft) and features hydrothermal activity in the form of black smokers, which were discovered in 1993.

== Geography and geology ==
=== Regional ===
Pito seamount lies north-northwest of Easter Island. In 1993, during the "Pito" expedition the submarine Nautile discovered active black smokers at its foot or at the summit.

The region northwest of Easter Island is characterized by the Easter Microplate, a plate set within the East Pacific Rise. Two rift zones delimit eastward and westward, while the Pito and the Orongo fracture zones form its northern and southern border, respectively. Pito seamount lies on the fracture zone of the same name and may indicate incipient seafloor spreading.

=== Local ===
Pito seamount has an 18 kilometres (11 mi) wide base, rises to a depth of 2,250 metres (7,380 ft) and features a 50 metres (160 ft) deep and almost 1 kilometre (0.62 mi) wide axial valley. Several smaller cones dot Pito's surface, and the seafloor depression, Pito Deep, lies northwest of the seamount. Fresh basaltic pillow lavas with geochemical characteristics typical of mid-ocean ridge basalts occur on Pito, as do sheet and lobate lava flows. The lavas often have a glassy surface.

The first black smokers have been found at depths of 2,243 metres (7,359 ft) at the foot of Pito seamount. A number of black smoker fields are found on Pito and are named Abe, Jason, Magnificent Village, Medea, Scotty's Castle and Sentry; the field originally discovered in 1993 is Magnificent Village and is also the largest. About fifty vents, some active and others inactive, have been observed in the summit area. Temperatures range 338–370 °C (640–698 °F). Extensive faulting in the region may aid in the establishment of a hydrothermal circulation.

Hydrothermal deposits contain chalcopyrite, marcasite, melnikovite, pyrite, sphalerite as well as general iron and zinc sulfides. Anhydrite and amorphous silica were also found at low frequency. Traces of bacterial activity, such as small pores and oxidation products, have been found in the hydrothermal deposits.

== Biology ==
Actinides, alvinellids, sea anemones, crabs, gastropods, mussels and shrimps have been encountered at the hydrothermal vents of Pito seamount. The biological community is not very diverse either due to a waning of hydrothermal activity or biogeographical barriers and lacks vestimentiferans. On inactive vents, brittle stars are found. Overall, the biota of Pito Seamount resembles that of other segments of the East Pacific Rise.
