= Hydrothermal vents and seamounts of the Azores =

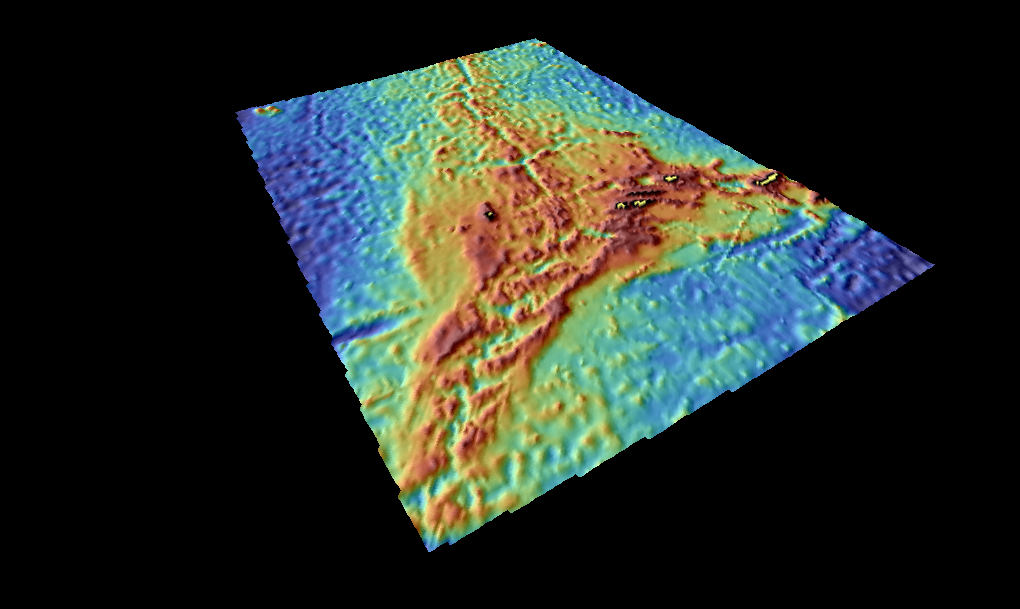
A relief map of the Azores Triple Fault region and southern bathymetric zone

The hydrothermal vents and seamounts of the Azores (Portuguese: fontes hidrotermais e montes submarinos dos Açores) are a series of Atlantic seamounts and hydrothermal vents that are part of the Mid-Atlantic Ridge system, giving rise to the archipelago and bathymetric region of the Azores. These geological structures, formed from masses of basalt (typical of mid-ocean regions), are of a geomorphological interest due to their rich deposits of ore. In addition it fosters a rich ecosystem of diverse subaquatic plant and animal life. There are food chains within this environment, for example, that are purely chemosynthetic, and do not need sunlight for photosynthesis.

== Geography ==
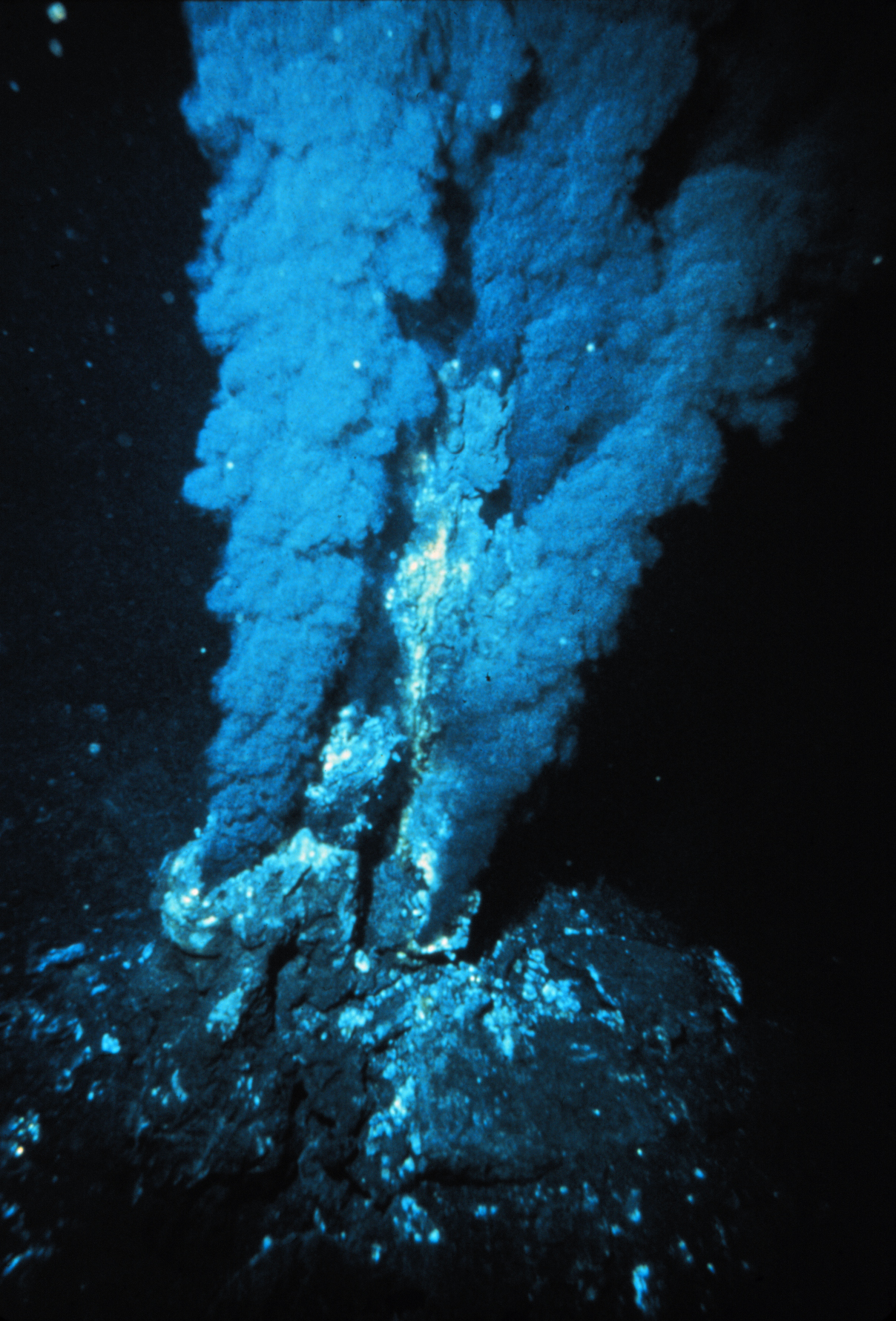
An example of a smokey hydrothermal vent emitting gases within the Mid-Atlantic Ridge Complex

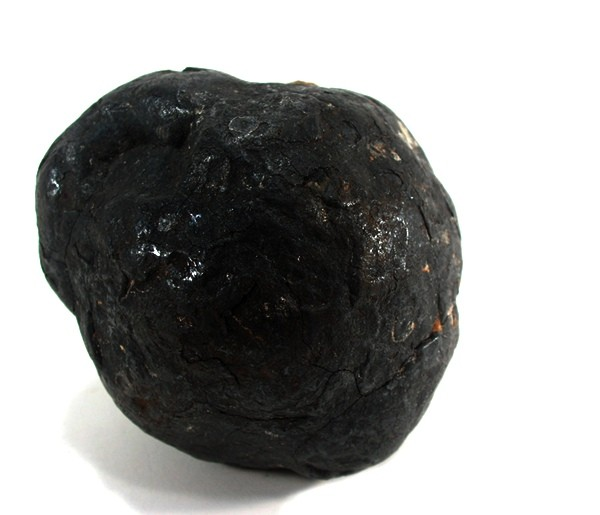
Example of a manganese-oxide nodule extracted from the Rift vent

The Azores consists of an extensive marine and terrestrial system of hundreds of active submarine mounts and volcanoes that extend from the Mid-Atlantic Ridge. The islands of the Azores are the visible representation of the complex ridge of undersea mountains that extend from Iceland to Antarctic. Below the waters of the Azores are undersea valleys and large mountains that are many times larger than the terrestrial continental mountain ranges. Formed by divergent boundary plate tectonics, the region is fractured and susceptible to earthquakes and natural volcanism, resulting in effusive or explosive volcanism. Beneath the Atlantic the formative processes continue to occur producing new land area such as the volcanic eruptions at Capelinhos or Serreta, but also through the venting of gases and pillow lavas, supporting a rich ecosystem.

Hydrothermal vent is the name given to a type of fumarole found in the ocean, with elevated temperatures, rich in dissolved minerals, resulting from the infiltration of ocean water into the Earth's crust and magma chambers. When expelled and contacting the cold waters, it results in a precipitation of mineral deposits, forming a characteristic plume of muddy waters and expelled minerals.

Seven large hydrothermal fields have been discovered within the waters of the Azores:

- Lucky Strike Hydrothermal Field (discovered in 1992), is the largest known hydrothermal field within the archipelago, with 21 active vents spread over 150 square kilometres (58 sq mi). The hydrothermal fluids reach temperatures of 330 °C (626 °F) (very close to the boiling point) under pressure at depths 1,100 metres (3,600 ft);
- Menez Gwen Hydrothermal Field (discovered in 1994), is characterized by a 700 metres (2,300 ft) volcano with a diameter of 17 kilometres (11 mi). Temperatures at these depths are close to 280 °C (536 °F), from various active vents a far as depths of 850 metres (2,790 ft);
- Rainbow Hydrothermal Field (discovered in 1994), it is characterized by 10 vents of high temperature (365 °C (689 °F)) at a depth of around 2,300 metres (7,500 ft) with very high trace metals and very low vent fluid chlorinity.
- Monte Saldanha Hydrothermal Field, discovered in 1998;
- Ewan Hydrothermal Field, discovered in 2006;
- Seapress Hydrothermal Field, discovered in 2009;
- Moytirra Hydrothermal Field, discovered in 2011;
- LUSO Hydrothermal Field, discovered in 2018.

These sites, with the exception of the Moytirra system, are located in the southern part of the archipelago, and have been investigated by national and international scientists. The isolated Dom João de Castro Bank is also considered in this group; located between São Miguel and Terceira, the seamount is one of the highest independent seamounts in the archipelago and home to a thriving marine volcanic habitat.

In 2010, a shallow hydrothermal field was discovered off the Ponta da Espalamaca, on the island of Faial, showing evidence of de-gasification.

== Biome ==
Efforts are being made to classify these areas as protected marine areas under the Convention for the Protection of the North Mid-Atlantic (OSPAR Convention) and in accordance with the requirements of the Habitats Directive. The World Wildlife Fund recognizes these efforts, awarding the Azorean regional government with the honorific "Gift to the Earth" prize for their contribution to the preservation of these marine ecosystems.

The Azores also provide a good place to study deep-ocean hydrothermal vents; various investigative projects by many scientists have documented the relationship between divergent boundary zones and subaquatic ecosystems. Communities of living creatures were discovered in the Lucky Strike Hydrothermal Field and the Menez Gwen Hydrothermal Field, both located within the Azores' Exclusive Economic Zone. The Lucky Strike field has a bio-geographically fauna, distinct from that of other hydrothermal fields in the archipelago, characterized by mussels and associated species. Meanwhile, the Menez Gwen field is a breeding ground for mussels, shrimp and crab species.

These hydrothermal environments are characterized by an elevated number of endemic and exclusive species; such as shrimp (like Rimicaris exoculata) or fish (such as Pachycara saldanhai), among others that exist in these areas. In addition, the chemotrophic subaquatic environment (as opposed to phototropic lithosphere) has resulted in a trophic habitat that is original and delicate. In these environments bacteria replace plants, through chemosynthesis, by transforming carbon molecules and nutrients into organic matter. Many of these ecosystems were only discovered in the Atlantic between 1977 and 1992.
