= Cold seep =

Ocean floor area with hydrocarbon-rich seepage

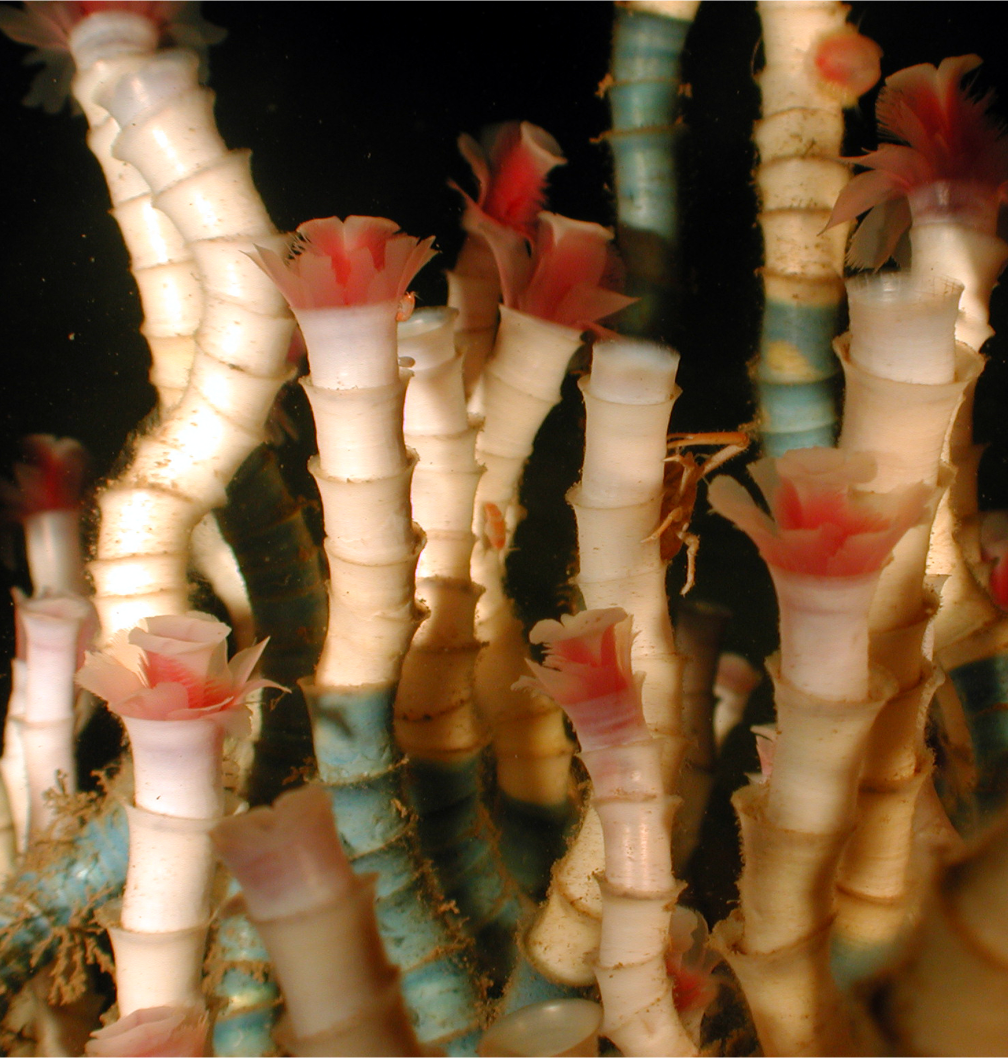
Tube worms (Lamellibrachia luymesi) are among the dominant species in one of four cold seep community types in the Gulf of Mexico.

A cold seep (sometimes called a cold vent) is an area of the ocean floor where seepage of fluids rich in hydrogen sulfide, methane, and other hydrocarbons occurs, often in the form of a brine pool. Cold does not mean that the temperature of the seepage is lower than that of the surrounding sea water; on the contrary, its temperature is often slightly higher. The "cold" is relative to the very warm (at least 60 °C or 140 °F) conditions of a hydrothermal vent. Cold seeps constitute a biome supporting several endemic species.

Cold seeps develop unique topography over time, where reactions between methane and seawater create carbonate rock formations and reefs. These reactions may also be dependent on bacterial activity. Ikaite, a hydrous calcium carbonate, can be associated with oxidizing methane at cold seeps.

== Types ==
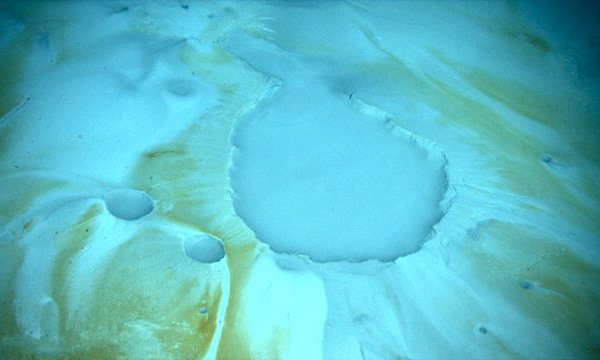
These craters mark the formation of brine pools, from which salt has seeped through the seafloor and encrusted the nearby substrate.

Types of cold seeps can be distinguished according to the depth, as shallow cold seeps and deep cold seeps. Cold seeps can also be distinguished in detail, as follows:

- oil/gas seeps
- gas seeps: methane seeps
- gas hydrate seeps
- brine seeps are formed in brine pools
- pockmarks
- mud volcanoes

== Formation and ecological succession ==
Cold seeps occur over fissures on the seafloor caused by tectonic activity. Oil and methane "seep" out of those fissures, get diffused by sediment, and emerge over an area several hundred meters wide.

Methane (CH_{4}) is the main component of natural gas. But in addition to being an important energy source for humans, methane also forms the basis of a cold seep ecosystem. Cold seep biota below 200 m (660 ft) typically exhibit much greater systematic specialization and reliance on chemoautotrophy than those from shelf depths. Deep-sea seeps sediments are highly heterogeneous. They sustain different geochemical and microbial processes that are reflected in a complex mosaic of habitats inhabited by a mixture of specialist (heterotrophic and symbiont-associated) and background fauna.

=== Chemosynthetic communities ===
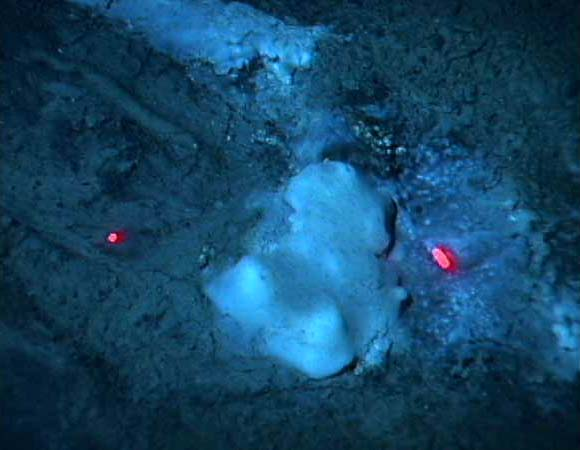
Bacterial mat consisting of sulfide-oxidizing bacteria Beggiatoa spp. at a seep on Blake Ridge, off South Carolina. The red dots are range-finding laser beams.

Biological research in cold seeps and hydrothermal vents has been mostly focused on the microbiology and the prominent macro-invertebrates thriving on chemosynthetic microorganisms. Much less research has been done on the smaller benthic fraction at the size of the meiofauna (<1 mm).

A community composition's orderly shift from one set of species to another is called ecological succession.

The first type of organism to take advantage of this deep-sea energy source is bacteria. Aggregating into bacterial mats at cold seeps, these bacteria metabolize methane and hydrogen sulfide (another gas that emerges from seeps) for energy. This process of obtaining energy from chemicals is known as chemosynthesis.

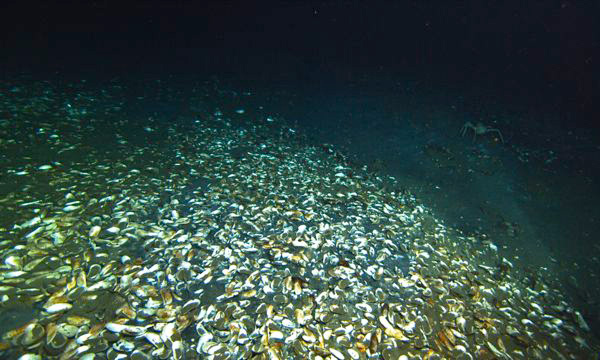
A mussel bed at the edge of the brine pool

During this initial stage, when methane is relatively abundant, dense mussel beds also form near the cold seep. Mostly composed of species in the genus Bathymodiolus, these mussels are primarily nourished by symbiotic bacteria that also produce energy from methane, similar to their relatives that form mats. Bathymodiolin mussels often supplement this nutrition source by filter feeding on particulate organic matter known as marine snow. Chemosynthetic bivalves are prominent constituents of the fauna of cold seeps and are represented in that setting by five families: Solemyidae, Lucinidae, Vesicomyidae, Thyasiridae, and Mytilidae.

This microbial activity produces calcium carbonate, which is deposited on the seafloor and forms a layer of rock. During a period lasting up to several decades, these rock formations attract siboglinid tubeworms, which settle and grow along with the mussels. Like the mussels, tubeworms rely on chemosynthetic bacteria (in this case, a type that needs hydrogen sulfide instead of methane) for survival. True to any symbiotic relationship, a tubeworm also provides for its bacteria by appropriating hydrogen sulfide from the environment. The sulfide not only comes from the water, but is also mined from the sediment through an extensive "root" system that a tubeworm "bush" establishes in the hard, carbonate substrate. A tubeworm bush can contain hundreds of individual worms, which can grow a meter or more above the sediment.

Cold seeps do not last indefinitely. As the rate of gas seepage slowly decreases, the shorter-lived, methane-hungry mussels (or more precisely, their methane-hungry bacterial symbionts) start to die off. At this stage, tubeworms become the dominant organism in a seep community. As long as there is some sulfide in the sediment, the sulfide-mining tubeworms can persist. Individuals of one tubeworm species Lamellibrachia luymesi have been estimated to live for over 250 years in such conditions.

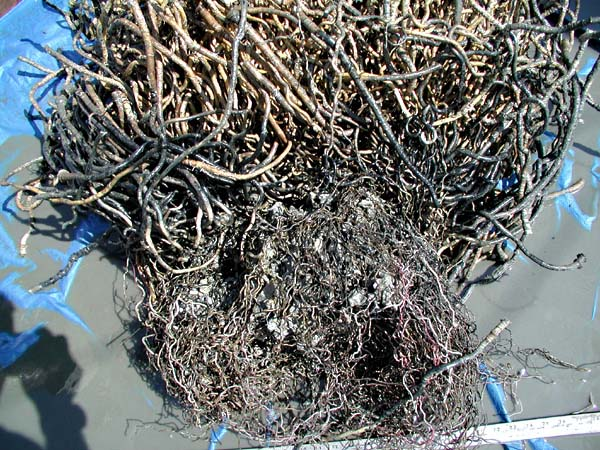
"Roots" of tubeworms also provide a supply of hydrogen sulfide from the sediment to the bacteria inside these tubeworms.

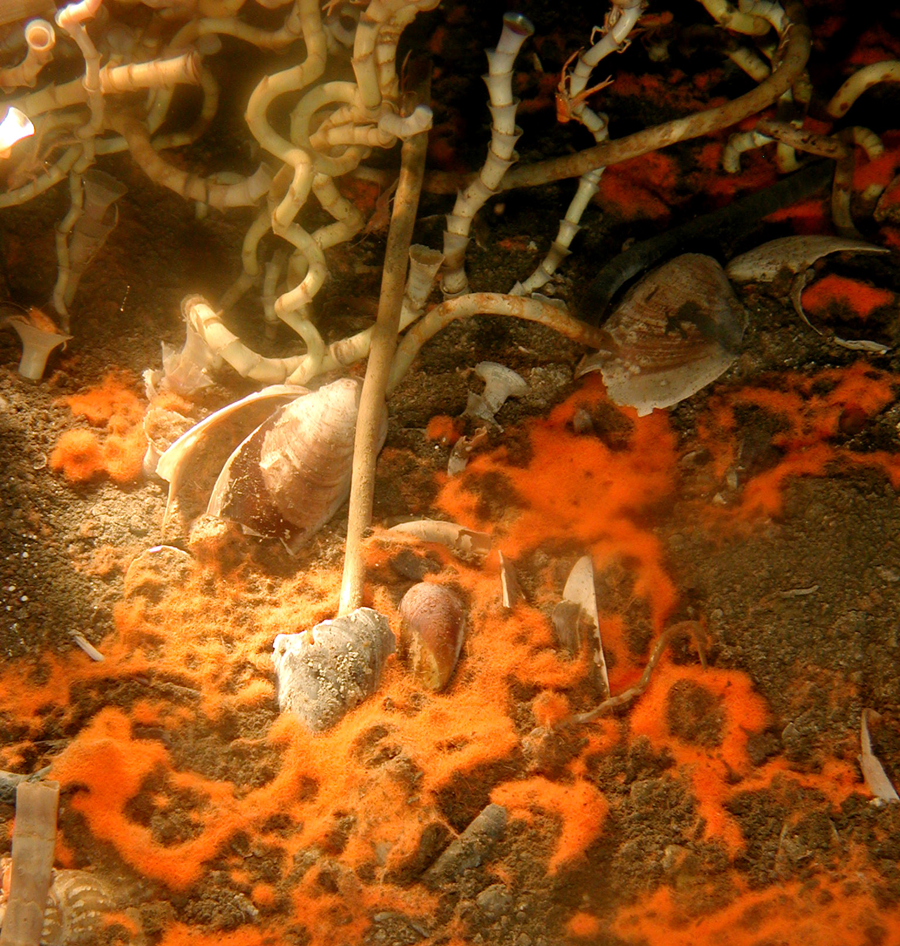
Symbiotic vestimentiferan tubeworm Lamellibrachia luymesi from a cold seep at 550 m depth in the Gulf of Mexico. In the sediments around the base are orange bacterial mats of the sulfide-oxidizing bacteria Beggiatoa spp. and empty shells of various clams and snails, which are also common inhabitants of the seeps.

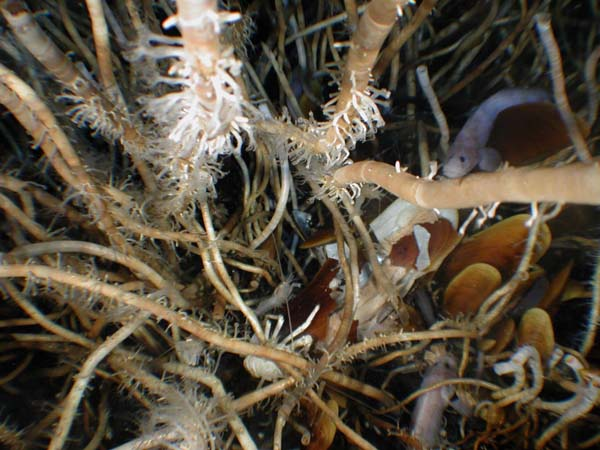
Tubeworms, soft corals, and chemosynthetic mussels at a seep located 3,000 m (9,800 ft) down on the Florida Escarpment. Eelpouts, a Galatheid crab, and an alvinocarid shrimp feed on mussels damaged during a sampling exercise.

=== The Benthic Filter ===
The organisms living at cold seeps have a large impact on the carbon cycle and on climate. Chemosynthetic organisms, specifically methanogenic (methane-consuming) organisms, prohibit the methane seeping up from beneath the seafloor from being released into the water above. Since methane is such a potent greenhouse gas, methane release could cause global warming when gas hydrate reservoirs destabilized. The consumption of methane by aerobic and anaerobic seafloor life is called "the benthic filter". The first part of this filter is the anaerobic bacteria and archaea underneath the seafloor that consume methane through the anaerobic oxidation of methane (AOM). If the flux of methane flowing through the sediment is too large, and the anaerobic bacteria and archaea are consuming the maximum amount of methane, then the excess methane is consumed by free-floating or symbiotic aerobic bacteria above the sediment at the seafloor. The symbiotic bacteria have been found in organisms such as tube worms and clams living at cold seeps; these organisms provide oxygen to the aerobic bacteria as the bacteria provide energy they obtain from the consumption of methane. Understanding how efficient the benthic filter is can help predict how much methane escapes the seafloor at cold seeps and enters the water column and eventually the atmosphere. Studies have shown that 50–90% of methane is consumed at cold seeps with bacterial mats. Areas with clam beds have less than 15% of methane escaping. Efficiency is determined by a number of factors. The benthic layer is more efficient with low flow of methane, and efficiency decreases as methane flow or the speed of flow increases. Oxygen demand for cold seep ecosystems is much higher than other benthic ecosystems, so if the bottom water does not have enough oxygen, then the efficiency of aerobic microbes in removing methane is reduced. The benthic filter cannot affect methane that is not traveling through the sediment. Methane can bypass the benthic filter if it bubbles to the surface or travels through cracks and fissures in the sediment. These organisms are the only biological sink of methane in the ocean.

=== Comparison with other communities ===
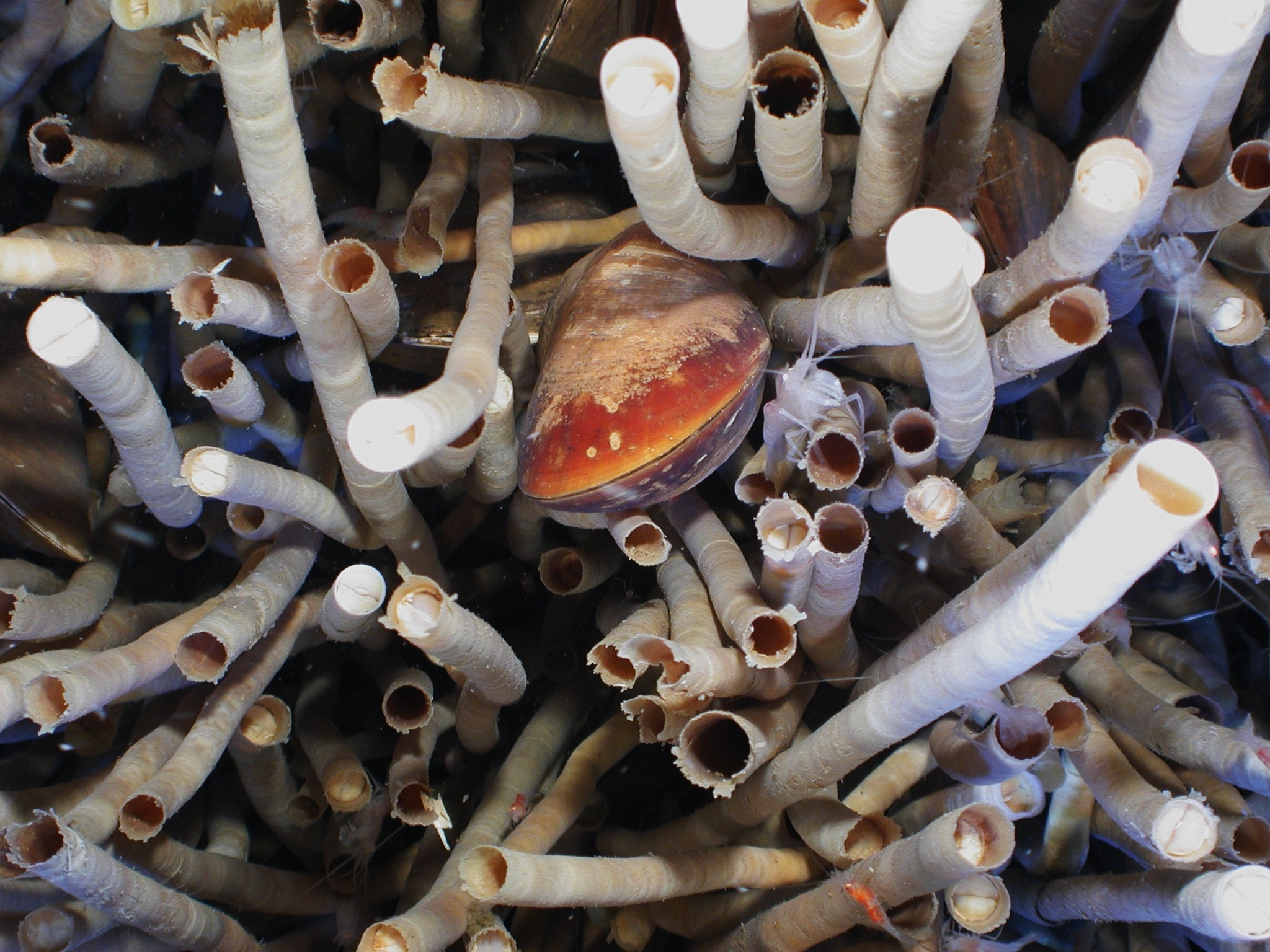
Lamellibrachia tube worms and mussel at a cold seep

Cold seeps and hydrothermal vents of deep oceans are communities that do not rely on photosynthesis for food and energy production. These systems are largely driven by chemosynthetic derived energy. Both systems share common characteristics such as the presence of reduced chemical compounds (H_{2}S and hydrocarbonates), local hypoxia or even anoxia, a high abundance and metabolic activity of bacterial populations, and the production of autochthonous, organic material by chemoautotrophic bacteria. Both hydrothermal vents and cold seeps show highly increased levels of metazoan biomass in association with a low local diversity. This is explained through the presence of dense aggregations of foundation species and epizoic animals living within these aggregations. Community-level comparisons reveal that vent, seep, and organic-fall macrofauna are very distinct in terms of composition at the family level, although they share many dominant taxa among highly sulphidic habitats.

However, hydrothermal vents and cold seeps also differ in many ways. Compared to the more stable cold seeps, vents are characterized by locally-high temperatures, strongly fluctuating temperatures, pH, sulfide and oxygen concentrations, often the absence of sediments, a relatively young age, and often-unpredictable conditions, such as waxing and waning of vent fluids or volcanic eruptions. Unlike hydrothermal vents, which are volatile and ephemeral environments, cold seeps emit at a slow and dependable rate. Likely owing to the cooler temperatures and stability, many cold seep organisms are much longer-lived than those inhabiting hydrothermal vents.

=== End of cold seep community ===
Finally, as cold seeps become inactive, tubeworms also start to disappear, clearing the way for corals to settle on the now-exposed carbonate substrate. The corals do not rely on hydrocarbons seeping out of the seafloor. Studies on Lophelia pertusa suggest they derive their nutrition primarily from the ocean surface. Chemosynthesis plays only a very small role, if any, in their settlement and growth. While deepwater corals do not seem to be chemosynthesis-based organisms, the chemosynthetic organisms that come before them enable the corals' existence. This hypothesis about establishment of deep water coral reefs is called hydraulic theory.

== Distribution ==
Cold seeps were discovered in 1983 by Charles Paull and colleagues on the Florida Escarpment in the Gulf of Mexico at a depth of 3,200 meters (10,500 ft). Since then, seeps have been discovered in many other parts of the world's oceans. Most have been grouped into five biogeographic provinces: Gulf of Mexico, Atlantic, Mediterranean, East Pacific, and West Pacific, but cold seeps are also known from under the ice shelf in Antarctica, the Arctic Ocean, the North Sea, Skagerrak, Kattegat, the Gulf of California, the Red Sea, the Indian Ocean, off southern Australia, and in the inland Caspian Sea. In the Pacific Northwest, a cold seep called Pythia's Oasis was discovered in 2015. With the recent discovery of a methane seep in the Southern Ocean, cold seeps are now known in all major oceans. Cold seeps are common along continental margins in areas of high primary productivity and tectonic activity, where crustal deformation and compaction drive emissions of methane-rich fluid. Cold seeps are patchily distributed, and they occur most frequently near ocean margins from intertidal to hadal depths. In Chile, cold seeps are known from the intertidal zone, in Kattegat, the methane seeps are known as "bubbling reefs" and are typically at depths of 0–30 m (0–100 ft), and off northern California, they can be found as shallow as 35–55 m (115–180 ft). Most cold seeps are located considerably deeper, well beyond the reach of ordinary scuba diving, and the deepest seep community known is found in the Japan Trench at a depth of 7,326 m (24,035 ft).

In addition to cold seeps existing today, the fossil remains of ancient seep systems have been found in several parts of the world. Some of these are located far inland in places formerly covered by prehistoric oceans.

=== In the Gulf of Mexico ===
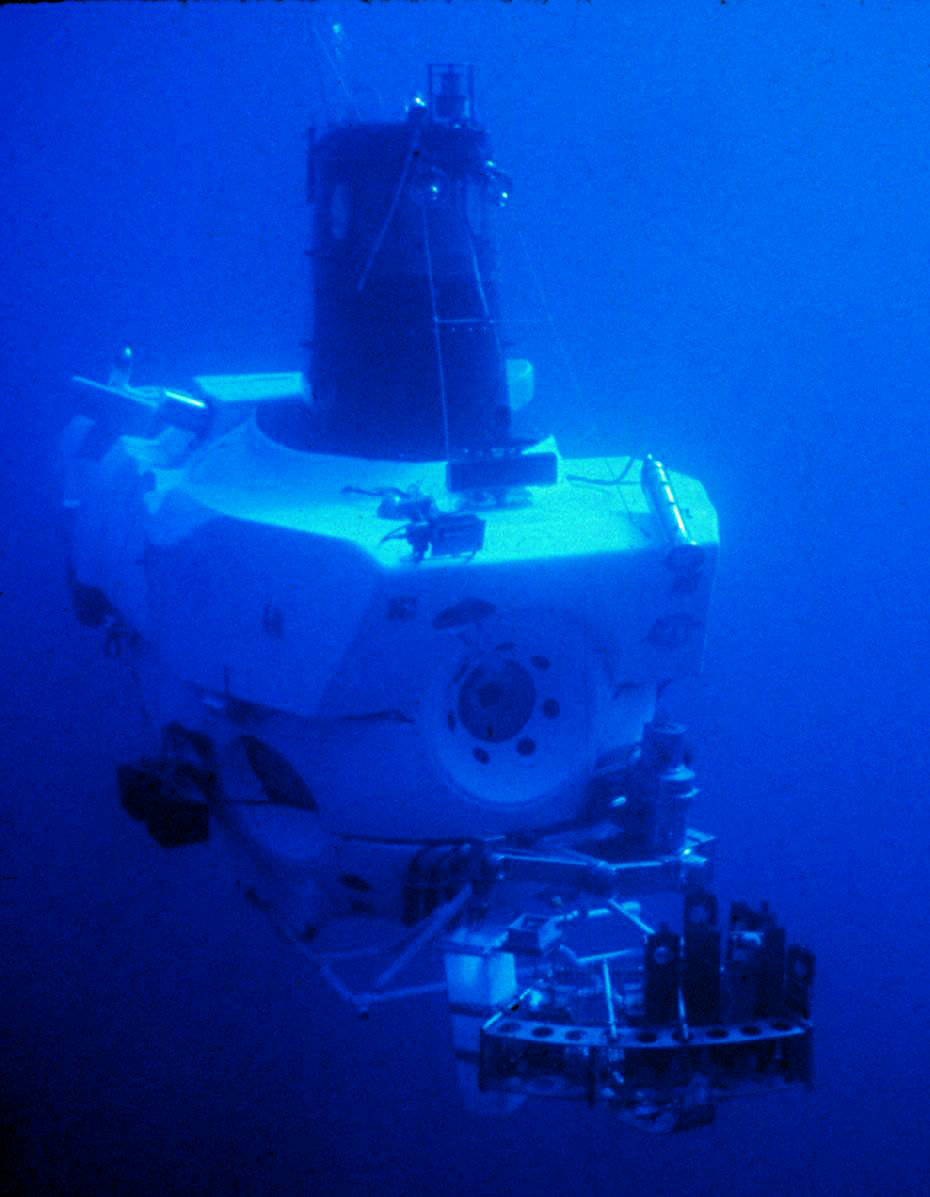
The crewed submersible DSV Alvin, which made possible the discovery of chemosynthetic communities in the Gulf of Mexico in 1983.

==== Discoveries ====
The chemosynthetic communities of the Gulf of Mexico have been studied extensively since the 1990s, and communities first discovered on the upper slope are likely the best understood seep communities in the world. The history of the discovery of these remarkable animals has all occurred since the 1980s. Each major discovery was unexpected―from the first hydrothermal vent communities anywhere in the world to the first cold seep communities in the Gulf of Mexico.

Communities were discovered in the eastern Gulf of Mexico in 1983 using the crewed submersible DSV Alvin, during a cruise investigating the bottom of the Florida Escarpment in areas of "cold" brine seepage, where they unexpectedly discovered tubeworms and mussels. Two groups fortuitously discovered chemosynthetic communities in the central Gulf of Mexico nearly concurrently in November and December 1984. During investigations in late December on the research vessel R/V Gyre cruise 84-G-12, by Texas A&M University, two bottom trawls were conducted to determine the effects of oil seepage on benthic ecology (until this investigation, all effects of oil seepage were assumed to be detrimental). Trawls unexpectedly recovered extensive collections of chemosynthetic organisms, including tubeworms and clams. a month earlier, LGL Ecological Research Associates was conducting a research cruise as part of the multiyear MMS Northern Gulf of Mexico Continental Slope Study (Gallaway et al., 1988). Bottom photography as part of this project obtained images from the end of a film roll of a deep-sea camera sled (processed on board the vessel 14 November 1984) that resulted in clear images of vesicomyid clam chemosynthetic communities (Rossman et al., 1987) coincidentally in the same manner as the first documentation of chemosynthetic communities at the Galapagos Rift investigating hot water plumes by camera sled in the Pacific in 1976 (Lonsdale 1977). Photography during the same LGL/MMS cruise also documented tube-worm communities in situ in the Central Gulf of Mexico for the first time (not processed until after the cruise; Boland, 1986) prior to the initial submersible investigations and firsthand descriptions of Bush Hill (27°47′02″N 91°30′31″W) in 1986. The Bush Hill site was targeted by acoustic "wipeout" zones or lack of substrate structure caused by seeping hydrocarbons. This was determined using an acoustic pinger system during the same cruise on the R/V Edwin Link (renamed from Sea Diver and only 113 ft (34 m)), which used one of the Johnson Sea Link submersibles. This site represents the first eyes-on human observations of chemosynthetic communities in the northern Gulf of Mexico and is characterized by dense tubeworm and mussel accumulations, as well as exposed carbonate outcrops with numerous gorgonian and Lophelia coral colonies. Bush Hill has become one of the most thoroughly-studied chemosynthetic sites in the world.

==== Distribution ====
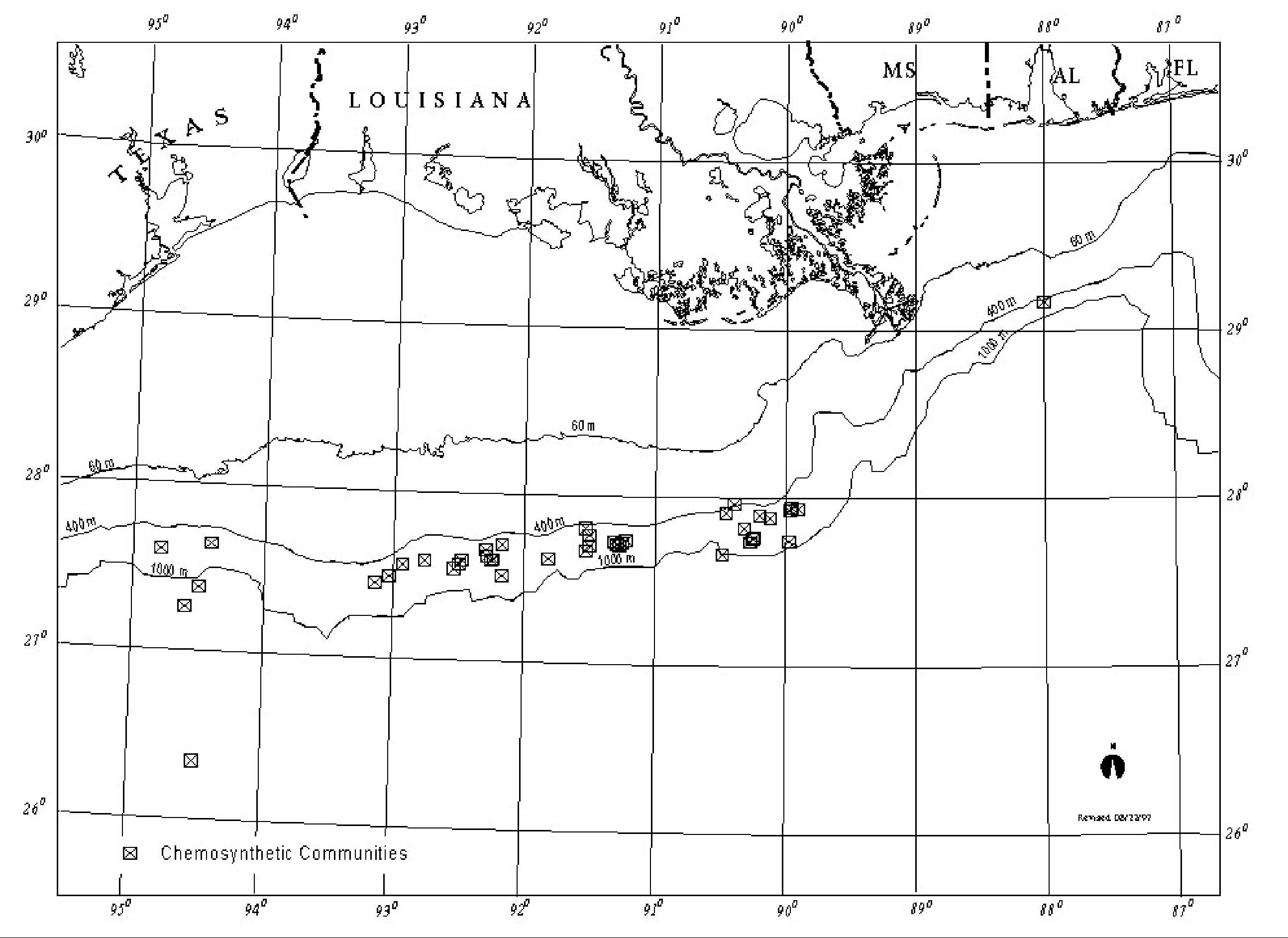
Chemosynthetic communities in the northern part of Gulf of Mexico around cold seeps known in 2000

There is a clear relationship between known hydrocarbon discoveries at great depth in the Gulf slope and chemosynthetic communities, hydrocarbon seepage, and authigenic minerals including carbonates at the seafloor. While the hydrocarbon reservoirs are broad areas several kilometers beneath the Gulf, chemosynthetic communities occur in isolated areas with thin veneers of sediment only a few meters thick.

The northern Gulf of Mexico slope includes a stratigraphic section more than 10 km (6.2 mi) thick and has been profoundly influenced by salt movement. Mesozoic source rocks from Upper Jurassic to Upper Cretaceous generate oil in most of the Gulf slope fields. Migration conduits supply fresh hydrocarbon materials through a vertical scale of 6–8 km (3.7–5.0 mi) toward the surface. The surface expressions of hydrocarbon migration are called seeps. Geological evidence demonstrates that hydrocarbon and brine seepage persists in spatially discrete areas for thousands of years.

The time scale for oil and gas migration from source systems is on the scale of millions of years (Sassen, 1997). Seepage from hydrocarbon sources through faults towards the surface tends to be diffused through the overlying sediment, carbonate outcroppings, and hydrate deposits, so the corresponding hydrocarbon seep communities tend to be larger (a few hundred meters wide) than chemosynthetic communities found around the hydrothermal vents of the Eastern Pacific (MacDonald, 1992). There are large differences in the concentrations of hydrocarbons at seep sites. Roberts (2001) presented a spectrum of responses to be expected under a variety of flux rate conditions varying from very slow seepage to rapid venting. Very-slow-seepage sites do not support complex chemosynthetic communities; rather, they usually only support simple microbial mats (Beggiatoa sp.).

In the upper slope environment, the hard substrates resulting from carbonate precipitation can have associated communities of non-chemosynthetic animals, including a variety of sessile cnidarians such as corals and sea anemones. At the rapid flux end of the spectrum, fluidized sediment generally accompanies hydrocarbons and formation fluids arriving at the seafloor. Mud volcanoes and mud flows result. Somewhere between these two end members exists the conditions that support densely populated and diverse communities of chemosynthetic organisms (microbial mats, siboglinid tube worms, bathymodioline mussels, lucinid and vesicomyid clams, and associated organisms). These areas are frequently associated with surface or near-surface gas hydrate deposits. They also have localized areas of lithified seafloor, generally authigenic carbonates but sometimes more exotic minerals such as barite are present.

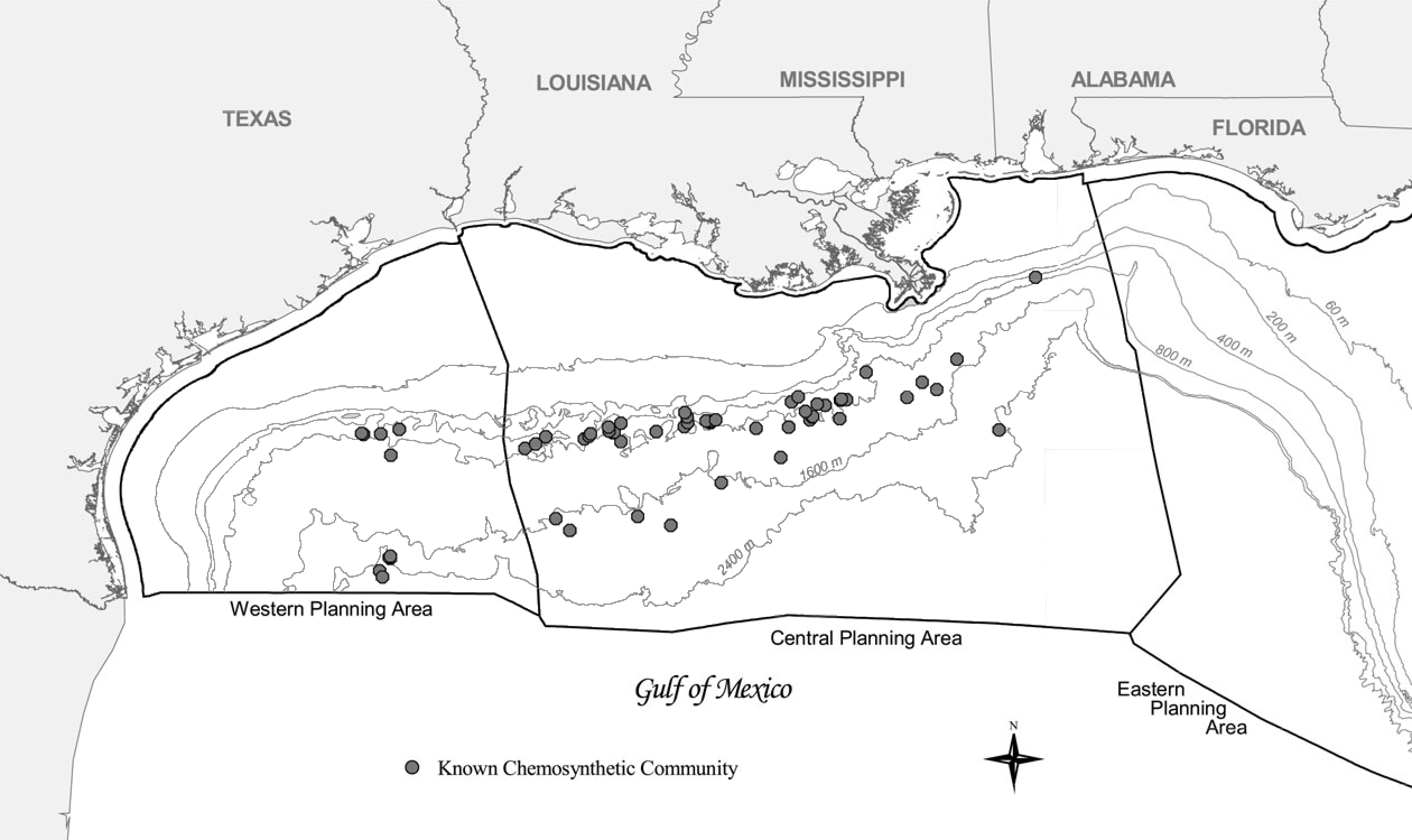
Chemosynthetic communities in the northern part of Gulf of Mexico around cold seeps known in 2006 include more than 50 communities

The widespread nature of Gulf of Mexico chemosynthetic communities was first documented during contracted investigations by the Geological and Environmental Research Group (GERG) of Texas A&M University for the Offshore Operators Committee. This survey remains the most widespread and comprehensive, although numerous additional communities have been documented since that time. Industry exploration for energy reserves in the Gulf of Mexico has also documented numerous new communities through a wide range of depths, including the deepest-known occurrence in the Central Gulf of Mexico in Alaminos Canyon Block 818 at a depth of 2,750 metres (9,020 feet). The occurrence of chemosynthetic organisms dependent on hydrocarbon seepage has been documented in water depths as shallow as 290 metres (950 feet) and as deep as 2,744 metres (9,003 feet). This depth range specifically places chemosynthetic communities in the deepwater region of the Gulf of Mexico, which is defined as water depths greater than 305 metres (1,001 feet).

Chemosynthetic communities are not found on the continental shelf, although they do appear in the fossil record in water shallower than 200 metres (660 feet). One theory explaining this is that predation pressure has varied substantially over the time period involved (Callender and Powell 1999). More than 50 communities are now known to exist in 43 Outer Continental Shelf (OCS) blocks. Although a systematic survey has not been done to identify all chemosynthetic communities in the Gulf of Mexico, there is evidence indicating that many more such communities may exist. The depth limits of discoveries probably reflect the limits of exploration (lack of submersibles capable of depths over 1,000 metres (3,300 feet)).

MacDonald et al. (1993 and 1996) have analyzed remote-sensing images from space that reveal the presence of oil slicks across the north-central Gulf of Mexico. Results confirmed extensive natural oil seepage in the Gulf of Mexico, especially in water depths greater than 1,000 metres (3,300 feet). A total of 58 additional potential locations were documented where seafloor sources were capable of producing perennial oil slicks. Estimated seepage rates ranged from 4 bbl/d (0.64 m^{3}/d) to 70 bbl/d (11 m^{3}/d) compared to less than 0.1 bbl/d (0.016 m^{3}/d) for ship discharges (both normalized for 1,000 mi^{2} (640,000 ac)). This evidence considerably increases the area where chemosynthetic communities dependent on hydrocarbon seepage may be expected.

The densest aggregations of chemosynthetic organisms have been found at water depths of around 500 metres (1,600 feet) and deeper. The best known of these communities was named Bush Hill by the investigators who first described it. It is a surprisingly large and dense community of chemosynthetic tube worms and mussels at a site of natural petroleum and gas seepage over a salt diapir in Green Canyon Block 185. The seep site is a small knoll that rises about 40 metres (130 feet) above the surrounding seafloor in about 580-metre (1,900-foot) water depth.

==== Stability ====
According to Sassen (1997) the role of hydrates at chemosynthetic communities has been greatly underestimated. The biological alteration of frozen gas hydrates was first discovered during the MMS study entitled "Stability and Change in Gulf of Mexico Chemosynthetic Communities". It is hypothesized that the dynamics of hydrate alteration could play a major role as a mechanism for regulation of the release of hydrocarbon gases to fuel biogeochemical processes and could also play a substantial role in community stability. Recorded bottom-water temperature excursions of several degrees in some areas such as the Bush Hill site (4–5 °C at 500-metre (1,600-foot) depth) are believed to result in dissociation of hydrates, resulting in an increase in gas fluxes (MacDonald et al., 1994). Although not as destructive as the volcanism at vent sites of the mid-ocean ridges, the dynamics of shallow hydrate formation and movement will clearly affect sessile animals that form part of the seepage barrier. There is potential of a catastrophic event where an entire layer of shallow hydrate could break free of the bottom and considerably affect local communities of chemosynthetic fauna. At deeper depths (>1,000 metres (3,300 feet)), the bottom-water temperature is colder (by approximately 3 °C) and undergoes less fluctuation. The formation of more stable and probably-deeper hydrates influences the flux of light hydrocarbon gases to the sediment surface, thus influencing the surface morphology and characteristics of chemosynthetic communities. Within complex communities such as Bush Hill, petroleum seems less important than previously thought (MacDonald, 1998b).

Through taphonomic studies (death assemblages of shells) and interpretation of seep assemblage composition from cores, Powell et al. (1998) reported that, overall, seep communities were persistent over periods of 500–1,000 years and probably throughout the entire Pleistocene. Some sites retained optimal habitat over geological time scales. Powell reported evidence of mussel and clam communities persisting in the same sites for 500–4,000 years. Powell also found that both the composition of species and trophic tiering of hydrocarbon seep communities tend to be fairly constant across time, with temporal variations only in numerical abundance. He found few cases in which the community type changed (from mussel to clam communities, for example) or had disappeared completely. Faunal succession was not observed. Surprisingly, when recovery occurred after a past destructive event, the same chemosynthetic species reoccupied a site. There was little evidence of catastrophic burial events, but two instances were found in mussel communities in Green Canyon Block 234. The most notable observation reported by Powell (1995) was the uniqueness of each chemosynthetic community site.

Precipitation of authigenic carbonates and other geologic events will undoubtedly alter surface seepage patterns over periods of many years, although through direct observation, no changes in chemosynthetic fauna distribution or composition were observed at seven separate study sites (MacDonald et al., 1995). A slightly longer period (19 years) can be referenced in the case of Bush Hill, the first Central Gulf of Mexico community described in situ in 1986. No mass die-offs or large-scale shifts in faunal composition have been observed (with the exception of collections for scientific purposes) over the 19-year history of research at this site.

All chemosynthetic communities are located in water depths beyond the effect of severe storms, including hurricanes, and there would have been no alteration of these communities caused from surface storms, including hurricanes.

==== Biology ====
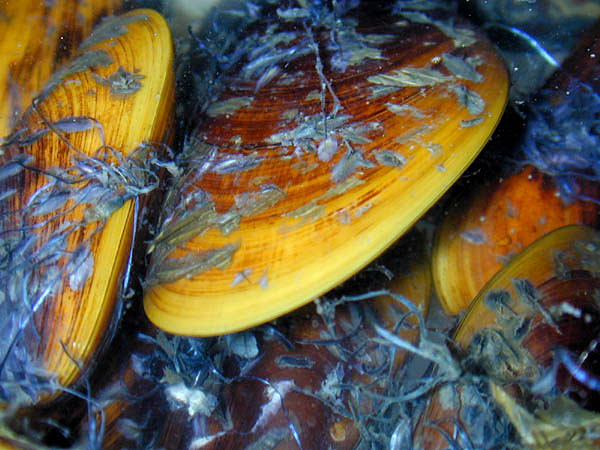
The mussel species Bathymodiolus childressi is the dominant species in the mytilid type of cold seep communities in the Gulf of Mexico.

MacDonald et al. (1990) has described four general community types. These are communities dominated by Vestimentiferan tube worms (Lamellibrachia c.f. barhami and Escarpia spp.), mytilid mussels (Seep Mytilid Ia, Ib, and III, and others), vesicomyid clams (Vesicomya cordata and Calyptogena ponderosa), and infaunal lucinid or thyasirid clams (Lucinoma sp. or Thyasira sp.). Bacterial mats are present at all sites visited to date. These faunal groups tend to display distinctive characteristics in terms of how they aggregate, the size of aggregations, the geological and chemical properties of the habitats in which they occur, and, to some degree, the heterotrophic fauna that occur with them. Many of the species found at these cold seep communities in the Gulf of Mexico are new to science and remain undescribed.

Individual lamellibrachid tube worms, the longer of two taxa found at seeps, can reach lengths of 3 metres (9.8 feet) and live hundreds of years (Fisher et al., 1997; Bergquist et al., 2000). Growth rates determined from recovered marked tube worms have been variable, ranging from no growth of 13 individuals measured one year to a maximum growth of 9.6 cm/yr (3.8 in/yr) in a Lamellibrachia individual (MacDonald, 2002). Average growth rate was 2.19 cm/yr (0.86 in/yr) for the Escarpia-like species and 2.92 cm/yr (1.15 in/yr) for lamellibrachids. These are slower growth rates than those of their hydrothermal vent relatives, but Lamellibrachia individuals can reach lengths 2–3 times that of the largest known hydrothermal vent species. Individuals of Lamellibrachia sp. in excess of 3 metres (9.8 feet) have been collected on several occasions, representing probable ages in excess of 400 years (Fisher, 1995). Vestimentiferan tube worm spawning is not seasonal, and recruitment is episodic.

Tubeworms are either male or female. One recent discovery indicates that the spawning of female Lamellibrachia appears to have produced a unique association with the large bivalve Acesta bullisi, which lives permanently attached to the anterior tube opening of the tubeworm, and feeds on the periodic egg release (Järnegren et al., 2005). This close association between the bivalves and tubeworms was discovered in 1984 (Boland, 1986) but not fully explained. Virtually all mature Acesta individuals are found on female rather than male tubeworms. This evidence and other experiments by Järnegren et al. (2005) seem to have solved this mystery.

Growth rates for methanotrophic mussels at cold seep sites have been reported (Fisher, 1995). General growth rates were found to be relatively high. Adult mussel growth rates were similar to mussels from a littoral environment at similar temperatures. Fisher also found that juvenile mussels at hydrocarbon seeps initially grow rapidly, but the growth rate drops markedly in adults; they grow to reproductive size very quickly. Both individuals and communities appear to be very long-lived. These methane-dependent mussels have strict chemical requirements that tie them to areas of the most active seepage in the Gulf of Mexico. As a result of their rapid growth rates, mussel recolonization of a disturbed seep site could occur relatively rapidly. There is some evidence that mussels also have some requirement of a hard substrate and could increase in numbers if suitable substrate is increased on the seafloor (Fisher, 1995). Two associated species are always found associated with mussel beds—the gastropod Bathynerita naticoidea and a small Alvinocarid shrimp—suggesting these endemic species have excellent dispersal abilities and can tolerate a wide range of conditions (MacDonald, 2002).

Unlike mussel beds, chemosynthetic clam beds may persist as a visual surface phenomenon for an extended period without input of new living individuals because of low dissolution rates and low sedimentation rates. Most clam beds investigated by Powell (1995) were inactive. Living individuals were rarely encountered. Powell reported that over a 50-year timespan, local extinctions and recolonization should be gradual and exceedingly rare. Contrasting these inactive beds, the first community discovered in the Central Gulf of Mexico consisted of numerous actively-plowing clams. The images obtained of this community were used to develop length/frequency and live/dead ratios as well as spatial patterns (Rosman et al., 1987a).

Extensive bacterial mats of free-living bacteria are also evident at all hydrocarbon seep sites. These bacteria may compete with the major fauna for sulfide and methane energy sources and may also contribute substantially to overall production (MacDonald, 1998b). The white, nonpigmented mats were found to be an autotrophic sulfur bacteria Beggiatoa species, and the orange mats possessed an unidentified non-chemosynthetic metabolism (MacDonald, 1998b).

Heterotrophic species at seep sites are a mixture of species unique to seeps (particularly molluscs and crustacean invertebrates) and those that are a normal component from the surrounding environment. Carney (1993) first reported a potential imbalance that could occur as a result of chronic disruption. Because of sporadic recruitment patterns, predators could gain an advantage, resulting in exterminations in local populations of mussel beds. It is clear that seep systems do interact with the background fauna, but conflicting evidence remains as to what degree outright predation on some specific community components such as tubeworms occurs (MacDonald, 2002). The more surprising results from this recent work is why background species do not utilize seep production more than seems to be evident. In fact, seep-associated consumers such as galatheid crabs and nerite gastropods had isotopic signatures, indicating that their diets were a mixture of seep and background production. At some sites, endemic seep invertebrates that would have been expected to obtain much if not all their diet from seep production actually consumed as much as 50 percent of their diets from the background.

=== In the Atlantic Ocean ===
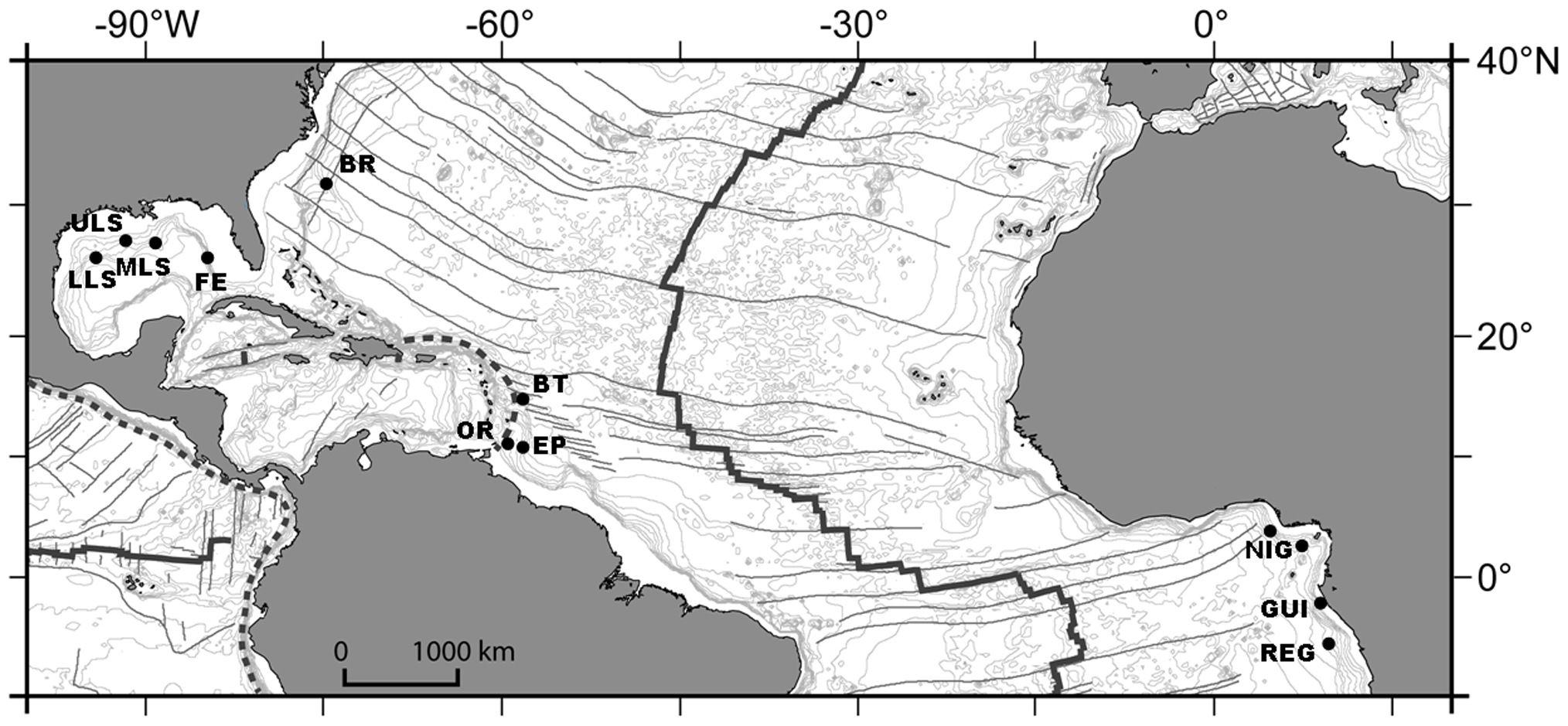
Map of cold seeps in the Atlantic Equatorial Belt. BR – Blake Ridge diapir BT – Barbados trench OR – Orenoque sectors EP – El Pilar sector NIG – Nigerian slope GUI – Guiness area REG – Regab pockmark.

Cold-seep communities in the western Atlantic Ocean have also been described from a few dives on mud volcanoes and diapirs between 1,000 and 5,000 m (3,300–16,400 ft) depth in the Barbados accretionary prism area and from the Blake Ridge diapir off North Carolina. More recently, seep communities have been discovered in the eastern Atlantic, on a giant pockmark cluster in the Gulf of Guinea near the Congo deep channel, and also on other pockmarks of the Congo margin, Gabon margin and Nigeria margin and in the Gulf of Cádiz.

The occurrence of chemosymbiotic biota in the extensive mud volcano fields of the Gulf of Cádiz was first reported in 2003. The chemosymbiotic bivalves collected from the mud volcanoes of the Gulf of Cadiz were reviewed in 2011.

Cold seeps are also known from the Northern Atlantic Ocean, even ranging into the Arctic Ocean, off Canada and Norway.

Extensive faunal sampling has been conducted from 400 and 3,300 m (1,300–10,800 ft) in the Atlantic Equatorial Belt from the Gulf of Mexico to the Gulf of Guinea including the Barbados accretionary prism, the Blake Ridge diapir, and in the Eastern Atlantic from the Congo and Gabon margins and the recently explored Nigeria margin during Census of Marine Life ChEss project. Of the 72 taxa identified at the species level, a total of 9 species or species complexes are identified as amphi-Atlantic.

The Atlantic Equatorial Belt seep megafauna community structure is influenced primarily by depth rather than by geographic distance. The bivalves Bathymodiolinae (within Mytilidae) species or complexes of species are the most widespread in the Atlantic. The Bathymodiolus boomerang complex is found at the Florida escarpment site, the Blake Ridge diapir, the Barbados prism, and the Regab site of Congo. The Bathymodiolus childressi complex is also widely distributed along the Atlantic Equatorial Belt from the Gulf of Mexico across to the Nigerian Margin, although not on the Regab or Blake Ridge sites. The commensal polynoid Branchipolynoe seepensis is known from the Gulf of Mexico, Gulf of Guinea, and Barbados. Other species with distributions extending from the eastern to western Atlantic are: gastropod Cordesia provannoides, the shrimp Alvinocaris muricola, the galatheids Munidopsis geyeri and Munidopsis livida, and probably the holothurid Chiridota hydrothermica.

There have been found cold seeps also in the Amazon deepsea fan. High-resolution seismic profiles near the shelf edge show evidence of near-surface slumps and faulting 20–50 m (66–164 ft) in the subsurface and concentrations (about 500 m^{2} or 5,400 ft^{2}) of methane gas. Several studies (e.g., Amazon Shelf Study—AMASEDS, LEPLAC, REMAC, GLORIA, Ocean Drilling Program) indicate that there is evidence for gas seepage on the slope off the Amazon fan based on the incidence of bottom-simulating reflections (BSRs), mud volcanoes, pockmarks, gas in sediments, and deeper hydrocarbon occurrences. The existence of methane at relatively shallow depths and extensive areas of gas hydrates have been mapped in this region. Also, gas chimneys have been reported, and exploratory wells have discovered sub-commercial gas accumulations and pockmarks along fault planes. A sound geological and geophysical understanding of the Foz do Amazonas Basin is already available and used by the energy companies.

Exploration of new areas, such as potential seep sites off of the east coast of the U.S. and the Laurentian fan where chemosynthetic communities are known deeper than 3,500 m (11,500 ft), and shallower sites in the Gulf of Guinea are need to study in the future.

=== In the Mediterranean ===
The first biological evidence for reduced environments in the Mediterranean Sea was the presence of Lucinidae and Vesicomyidae bivalve shells cored on the top of the Napoli mud volcano (33°43′52″N 24°40′52″E; "Napoli" is only a name of a seamount. It is located south of Crete), located at 1,900 m deep on the Mediterranean Ridge in the subduction zone of the African Plate. This was followed by the description of a new Lucinidae bivalve species, Lucinoma kazani, associated with bacterial endosymbionts. In the southeastern Mediterranean, communities of polychaetes and bivalves were also found associated with cold seeps and carbonates near Egypt and the Gaza Strip at depths of 500–800 m, but no living fauna was collected. The first in situ observations of extensive living chemosynthetic communities in the eastern Mediterranean Sea prompted cooperation between biologists, geochemists, and geologists. During submersible dives, communities comprising large fields of small bivalves (dead and alive), large siboglinid tube worms, isolated or forming dense aggregations, large sponges, and associated endemic fauna were observed in various cold seep habitats associated with carbonate crusts at 1,700–2,000 m depth. Two mud volcano fields were first explored, one along the Mediterranean Ridge, where most of them were partially (Napoli, Milano mud volcanoes) or totally (Urania, Maidstone mud volcanoes) affected by brines, and the other on the Anaximander mounds south of Turkey. The latter area includes the large Amsterdam mud volcano, which is affected by recent mudflows, and the smaller Kazan or Kula mud volcanoes. Gas hydrates have been sampled at the Amsterdam and Kazan mud volcanoes, and high methane levels have been recorded above the seafloor. Several provinces of the Nile deep-sea fan have been explored recently. These include the very active brine seepage named the Menes Caldera in the eastern province between 2,500 m and 3,000 m, the pockmarks in the central area along middle and lower slopes, and the mud volcanoes of the eastern province, as well as one in the central upper slope (North Alex area) at 500 m depth.

During these first exploratory dives, symbiont-bearing taxa that are similar to those observed on the Olimpi and Anaximander mud fields were sampled and identified. This similarity is not surprising, as most of these taxa were originally described from dredging in the Nile fan. Up to five species of bivalves harboring bacterial symbionts colonized these methane- and sulfide-rich environments. A new species of Siboglinidae polychaete, Lamellibrachia anaximandri, the tubeworm colonizing cold seeps from the Mediterranean ridge to the Nile deep-sea fan, has just been described in 2010. Moreover, the study of symbioses revealed associations with chemoautotrophic bacteria, sulfur oxidizers in Vesicomyidae and Lucinidae bivalves and Siboglinidae tubeworms, and highlighted the exceptional diversity of bacteria living in symbiosis with small Mytilidae. The Mediterranean seeps appear to represent a rich habitat characterized by megafauna species richness (e.g., gastropods) or the exceptional size of some species such as sponges (Rhizaxinella pyrifera) and crabs (Chaceon mediterraneus), compared with their background counterparts. This contrasts with the low macro- and mega-faunal abundance and diversity of the deep eastern Mediterranean. Seep communities in the Mediterranean that include endemic chemosynthetic species and associated fauna differ from the other known seep communities in the world at the species level but also by the absence of the large-size bivalve genera Calyptogena or Bathymodiolus. The isolation of the Mediterranean seeps from the Atlantic Ocean after the Messinian crisis led to the development of unique communities, which are likely to differ in composition and structure from those in the Atlantic Ocean. Further expeditions involved quantitative sampling of habitats in different areas, from the Mediterranean Ridge to the eastern Nile deep-sea fan. Cold seeps discovered in the Sea of Marmara in 2008 have also revealed chemosynthesis-based communities that showed a considerable similarity to the symbiont-bearing fauna of eastern Mediterranean cold seeps.

=== In the Indian Ocean ===
In the Makran Trench, a subduction zone along the northeastern margin of the Gulf of Oman adjacent to the southwestern coast of Pakistan and the southeastern coast of Iran, compression of an accretionary wedge has resulted in the formation of cold seeps and mud volcanoes.

=== In the West Pacific ===
Native aluminium has been reported also in cold seeps in the northeastern continental slope of the South China Sea and Chen et al. (2011) have proposed a theory of its origin as resulting by reduction from tetrahydroxoaluminate Al(OH)_{4}^{−} to metallic aluminium by bacteria.

==== Japan ====
Chemosynthetic communities around Japan
Cold seep	Kuril–Kamchatka Trench-Japan Trench; Sea of Japan; Sagami Bay; Suruga Bay; Nankai Trough; Kagoshima Bay; Ryukyu Trench
Hydrothermal vent	Izu Islands-Bonin Islands; Mariana Islands; Okinawa Trough
Whale fall	Sagami Bay; Off Cape Nomamisaki (East China Sea); Tori-shima seamount (Izu Islands)

Deep sea communities around Japan are mainly researched by Japan Agency for Marine-Earth Science and Technology (JAMSTEC). DSV Shinkai 6500, Kaikō, and other groups have discovered many sites.

Methane seep communities in Japan are distributed along plate convergence areas because of the accompanying tectonic activity. Many seeps have been found in the Japan Trench, Nankai Trough, Ryukyu Trench, Sagami Bay, Suruga Bay, and the Sea of Japan.

Members of cold seep communities are similar to other regions in terms of family or genus, such as Polycheata, Lamellibrachia, Bivalavia, Solemyidae, Bathymodiolus in Mytilidae, Thyasiridae, Calyptogena in Vesicomyidae, and so forth. Many of the species in Japan's cold seeps are endemic.

In Kagoshima Bay, there are methane gas seepages called "tagiri" (boiling). Lamellibrachia satsuma live around there. The depth of this site is only 80 m, which is the shallowest point where Siboglinidae are known to live. L. satsuma may be kept in an aquarium for a long period at 1 atm. Two aquariums in Japan are keeping and displaying L. satsuma. An observation method to introduce it into a transparent vinyl tube is being developed.

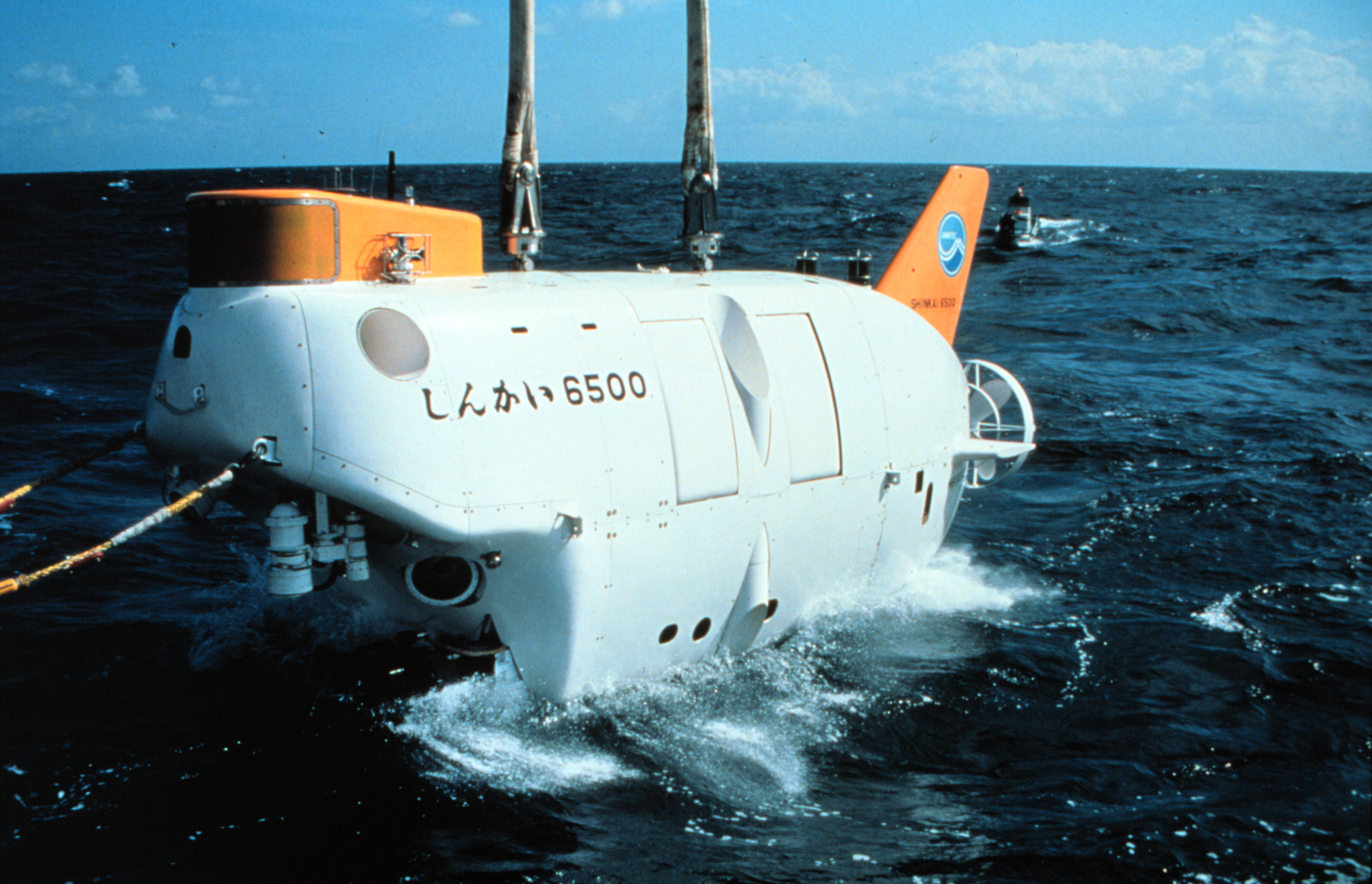
DSV Shinkai 6500

DSV Shinkai 6500 discovered vesicomyid clam communities in the Southern Mariana Forearc. They depend on methane, which originates in serpentinite. Other chemosynthetic communities would depend on hydrocarbon origins organic substance in crust, but these communities depend on methane originating from inorganic substances from the mantle.

In 2011, the area around the Japan Trench suffered from the Tōhoku earthquake. There are cracks, methane seepages, and bacterial mats which were probably created by the earthquake.

==== New Zealand ====
Off the mainland coast of New Zealand, shelf-edge instability is enhanced in some locations by cold seeps of methane-rich fluids that likewise support chemosynthetic faunas and carbonate concretions. Dominant animals are tubeworms of the family Siboglinidae and bivalves of families Vesicomyidae and Mytilidae (Bathymodiolus). Many of its species appear to be endemic. Deep bottom trawling has severely damaged cold seep communities, and those ecosystems are threatened. Cold seeps are found at depths down to 2,000 m, and the topographic and chemical complexity of the habitats are not yet mapped. The scale of new-species discovery in these poorly-studied or unexplored ecosystems is likely to be high.

=== In the East Pacific ===
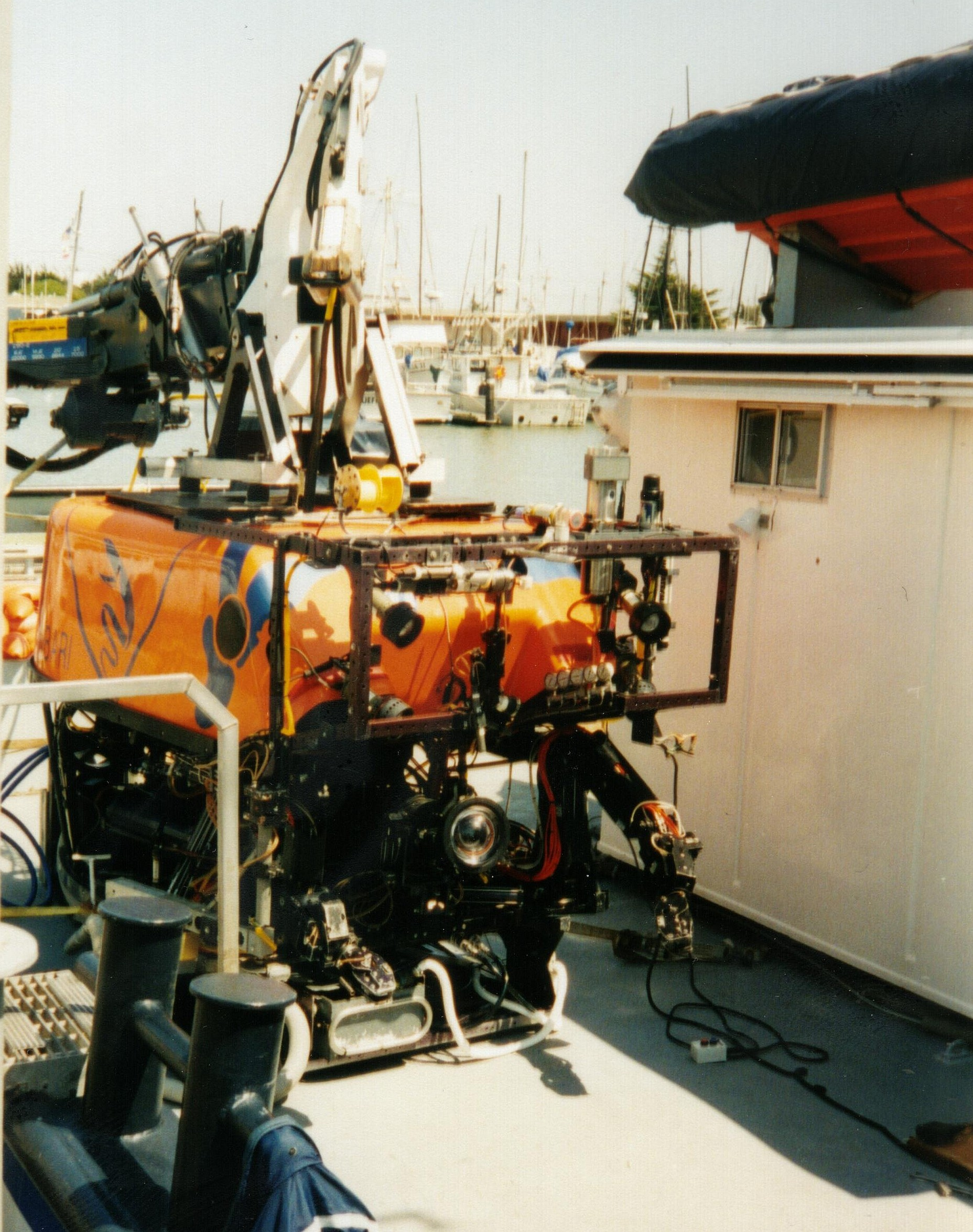
Monterey Bay Aquarium Research Institute has used remotely operated underwater vehicle Ventana in the research of Monterey Bay cold seeps.

In the deep sea, the COMARGE project has studied the biodiversity patterns along and across the Chilean margin through a complexity of ecosystems such as methane seeps and oxygen minimum zones, reporting that such habitat heterogeneity may influence the biodiversity patterns of the local fauna. Seep fauna include bivalves of families Lucinidae, Thyasiridae, Solemyidae (Acharax sp.), and Vesicomyidae (Calyptogena gallardoi) and polychaetes (Lamellibrachia sp. and two other polychaete species). Furthermore, in these soft reduced sediments below the oxygen minimum zone off the Chilean margin, a diverse microbial community composed by a variety of large prokaryotes (mainly large multi-cellular filamentous "mega bacteria" of the genera Thioploca and Beggiatoa, and of "macrobacteria" including a diversity of phenotypes), protists (ciliates, flagellates, and foraminifers), as well as small metazoans (mostly nematodes and polychaetes) has been found. Gallardo et al. (2007) argue that the likely chemolithotrophic metabolism of most of these mega- and macrobacteria offer an alternative explanation to fossil findings, in particular to those from obvious non-littoral origins, suggesting that traditional hypotheses on the cyanobacterial origin of some fossils may have to be revised.

Cold seeps (pockmarks) are also known from depths of 130 m in the Hecate Strait, British Columbia, Canada. Unobvious fauna (also unobvious for cold seeps) have been found there with these dominating species: sea snail Fusitriton oregonensis, anemone Metridium giganteum, encrusting sponges, and bivalve Solemya reidi.

Cold seeps with chemosynthetic communities along the USA Pacific coast occur in Monterey Canyon, just off Monterey Bay, California on a mud volcano. There have been found, for example, Calyptogena clams Calyptogena kilmeri and Calyptogena pacifica and foraminiferan Spiroplectammina biformis.

- map of cold seeps in the Monterey Bay

Additionally, seeps have been discovered offshore southern California in the inner California Borderlands along several fault systems including the San Clemente fault, San Pedro fault, and San Diego Trough fault. Fluid flow at the seeps along the San Pedro and San Diego Trough faults appears controlled by localized restraining bends in the faults.

=== In the Antarctic ===
The first cold seep from the Southern Ocean was reported in 2005. The relatively few investigations to the Antarctic deep sea have shown the presence of deep-water habitats, including hydrothermal vents, cold seeps, and mud volcanoes. Other than the Antarctic Benthic Deep-Sea Biodiversity Project (ANDEEP) cruises, little work has been done in the deep sea. There are more species waiting to be described.

== Detection ==
With continuing experience, particularly on the upper continental slope in the Gulf of Mexico, the successful prediction of the presence of tubeworm communities continues to improve; however, chemosynthetic communities cannot be reliably detected directly using geophysical techniques. Hydrocarbon seeps that allow chemosynthetic communities (Guaymas Basin) to exist do modify the geological characteristics in ways that can be remotely detected, but the time scales of co-occurring active seepage and the presence of living communities is always uncertain. These known sediment modifications include (1) precipitation of authigenic carbonate in the form of micronodules, nodules, or rock masses; (2) formation of gas hydrates; (3) modification of sediment composition through concentration of hard chemosynthetic organism remains (such as shell fragments and layers); (4) formation of interstitial gas bubbles or hydrocarbons; and (5) formation of depressions or pockmarks by gas expulsion. These features give rise to acoustic effects such as wipeout zones (no echoes), hard bottoms (strongly reflective echoes), bright spots (reflection enhanced layers), or reverberant layers (Behrens, 1988; Roberts and Neurauter, 1990). Potential locations for most types of communities can be determined by careful interpretation of these various geophysical modifications, but to date, the process remains imperfect and confirmation of living communities requires direct visual techniques.

== Fossilized records ==
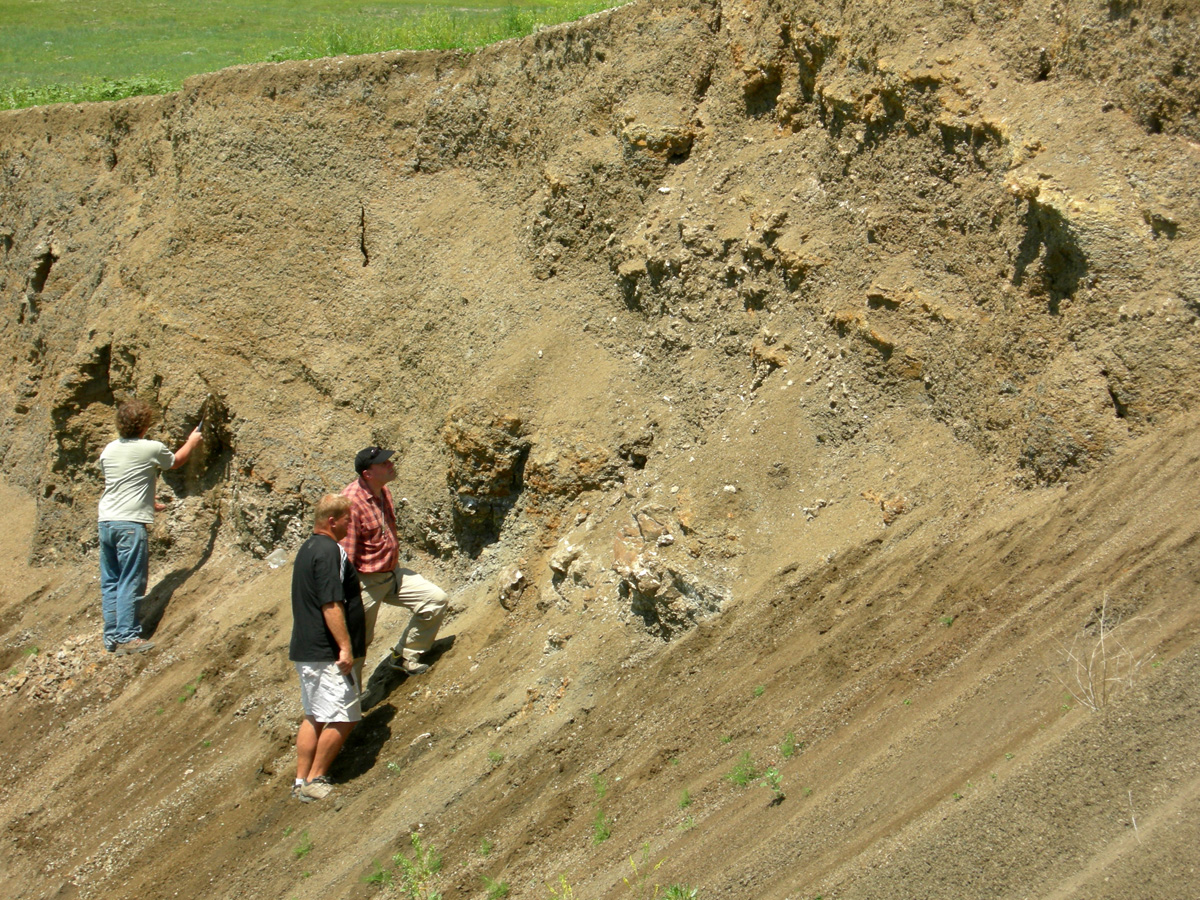
Late Cretaceous cold seep deposit in the Pierre Shale, southwest South Dakota

Cold seep deposits are found throughout the Phanerozoic geologic record, especially in the Late Mesozoic and Cenozoic. Notable examples can be found in the Permian of Tibet, the Jurassic Agoudim Formation of Morocco, the Cretaceous of Colorado and Hokkaido, the Palaeogene of Honshu, the Neogene of Northern Italy, and the Pleistocene of California. These fossil cold seeps are characterized by mound-like topography (where preserved), coarsely crystalline carbonates, and abundant mollusks and brachiopods.

== Environmental impacts ==
Major threats that cold seep ecosystems and their communities face today are seafloor litter, chemical contaminants, and climate change. Seafloor litter alters the habitat by providing hard substrate where none was available before or by overlying the sediment, thereby inhibiting gas exchange and interfering with organisms on the bottom of the sea. Studies of marine litter in the Mediterranean include surveys of seabed debris on the continental shelf, slope, and bathyal plain. In most studies, plastic items accounted for much of the debris, sometimes as much as 90% or more of the total, owing to their ubiquitous use and poor degradability.

Weapons and bombs have also been discarded at sea, and their dumping in open waters contributes to seafloor contamination. Another major threat to the benthic fauna is the presence of lost fishing gear, such as nets and longlines, which contribute to ghost fishing and can damage fragile ecosystems such as cold-water corals.

Chemical contaminants such as persistent organic pollutants, toxic metals (e.g., Hg, Cd, Pb, Ni), radioactive compounds, pesticides, herbicides, and pharmaceuticals are also accumulating in deep-sea sediments. Topography (such as canyons) and hydrography (such as cascading events) play a major role in the transportation and accumulation of these chemicals from the coast and shelf to the deep basins, affecting the local fauna. Recent studies have detected the presence of significant levels of dioxins in the commercial shrimp Aristeus antennatus and significant levels of persistent organic pollutants in mesopelagic and bathypelagic cephalopods.

Climate-driven processes and climate change will affect the frequency and intensity of cascading, with unknown effects on the benthic fauna. Another potential effect of climate change is related to energy transport from surface waters to the seafloor. Primary production will change in the surface layers according to sun exposure, water temperature, major stratification of water masses, and other effects, and this will affect the food chain down to the deep seafloor, which will be subject to differences in quantity, quality, and timing of organic matter input. As commercial fisheries move into deeper waters, all of these effects will affect the communities and populations of organisms in cold seeps and the deep sea in general.

== See also ==
- Chemotroph
- Gas emission crater
- Gas hydrate pingo
- Guaymas Basin
