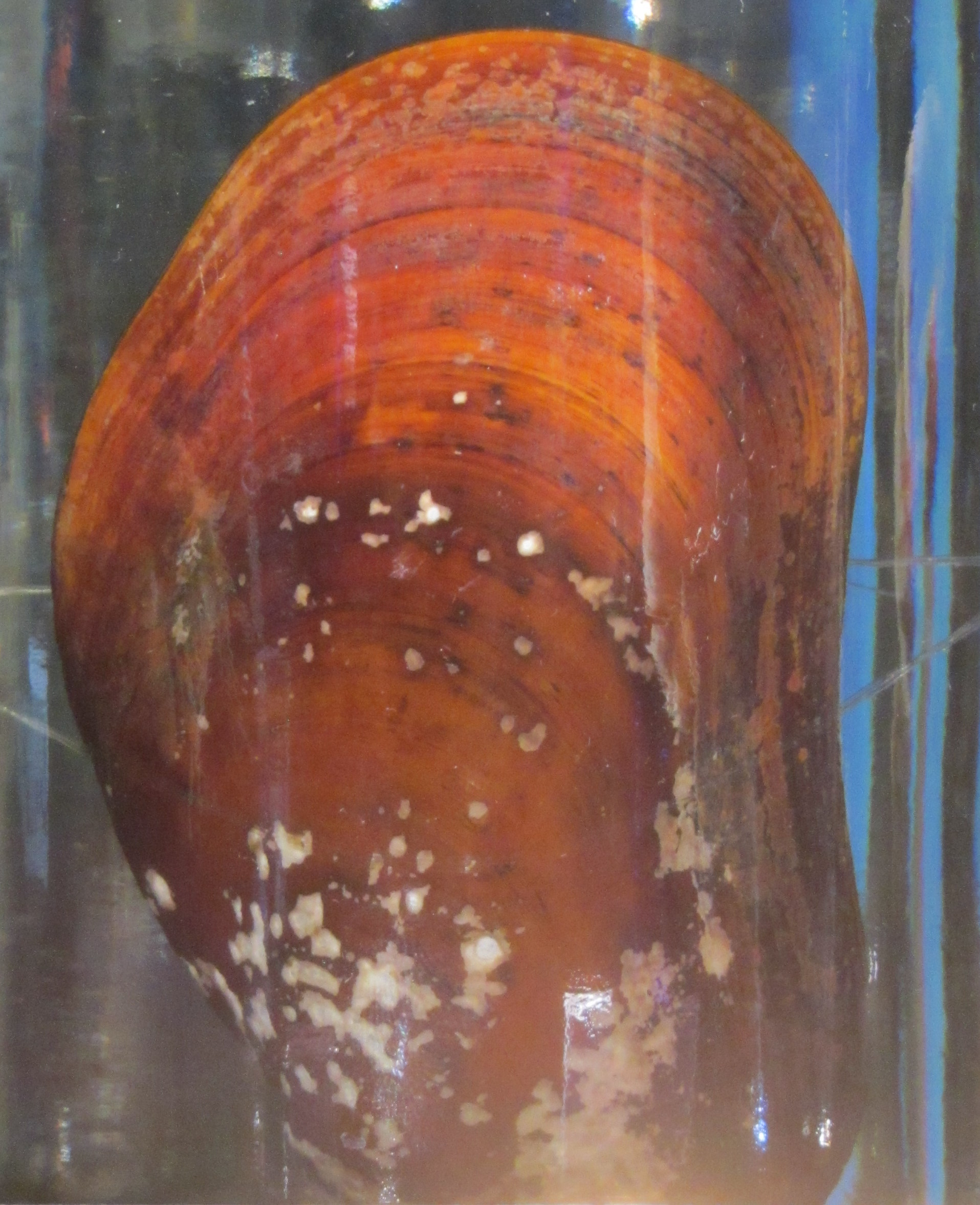

Scientific classification
- Kingdom: Animalia
- Phylum: Mollusca
- Class: Bivalvia
- Order: Mytilida
- Family: Modiolidae
- Genus: Bathymodiolus
- Species: B. platifrons

Binomial name
- Bathymodiolus platifrons Hashimoto & Okutani, 1994

= Bathymodiolus platifrons =

Species of bivalve

Bathymodiolus platifrons, described by Hashimoto and Okutani in 1994, is a deep-sea mussel that is common in hydrothermal vents and methane seeps in the Western Pacific Ocean.

== Symbiosis ==
Bathymodiolus platifrons harbours methane-oxidizing bacteria in its gill, which help to transfer methane into material and energy to help it to thrive in such environments.
