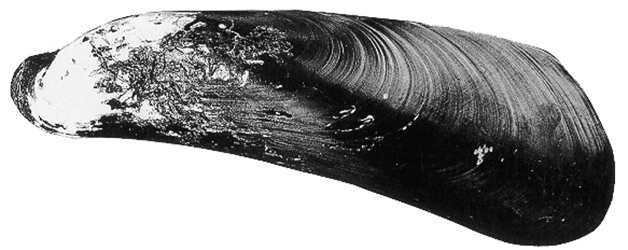
- The holotype of Gigantidas tangaroa, National Institute of Water and Atmospheric Research

Conservation status
- Nationally Critical (NZ TCS)

Scientific classification
- Kingdom: Animalia
- Phylum: Mollusca
- Class: Bivalvia
- Order: Mytilida
- Family: Modiolidae
- Genus: Bathymodiolus
- Species: B. tangaroa

Binomial name
- Bathymodiolus tangaroa (Cosel & Marshall, 2003)

Synonyms
- Bathymodiolus tangaroa Cosel & B. A. Marshall, 2003; Bathymodiolus tangaroa tangaroa Cosel & B. A. Marshall, 2003; Bathymodiolus tangaroa tuerkayi Cosel & R. Janssen, 2008; Gigantidas tangaroa tangaroa (Cosel & B. A. Marshall, 2003)· accepted, alternate representation; Gigantidas tangaroa tuerkayi (Cosel & R. Janssen, 2008)· accepted, alternate representation

= Gigantidas tangaroa =

Species of bivalve

Gigantidas tangaroa is a species of deep-sea mussel, a marine bivalve mollusk in the family Mytilidae, the mussels.

== Habitat ==
This species was first described from northern New Zealand, from seeps off Cape Turnagain and Cape Kidnappers at a depth of 920 to 1,205 metres (3,018 to 3,953 ft).

== Description ==
The shell of this species is large, up to 200 millimetres (7.9 in) long, showing external dull white growth lines. Its anterior margin is narrow but evenly rounded. Its posterior margin is convex dorsally, its posterior angulation well-defined, situated above the posterior adductor scar. Its periostracum is thick, hard and a dark brown colour. Its anterior adductor scar is short, and its pallial line curves parallel to its ventral margin.
