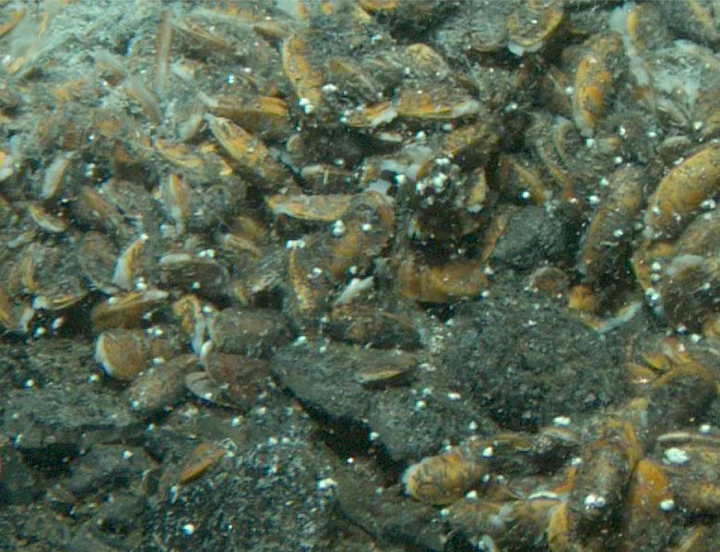

Scientific classification
- Kingdom: Animalia
- Phylum: Mollusca
- Class: Bivalvia
- Order: Mytilida
- Family: Modiolidae
- Genus: Bathymodiolus
- Species: B. thermophilus

Binomial name
- Bathymodiolus thermophilus Kenk & Wilson, 1985

= Bathymodiolus thermophilus =

Species of bivalve

Bathymodiolus thermophilus is a species of large, deep water mussel, a marine bivalve mollusc in the family Mytilidae, the true mussels. The species was discovered at abyssal depths when submersible vehicles such as DSV Alvin began exploring the deep ocean. It occurs on the sea bed, often in great numbers, close to hydrothermal vents where hot, sulphur-rich water wells up through the floor of the Pacific Ocean. They can form dense aggregations and act as a foundation species in vent habitats. A major component of its nutrition can come from chemosynthetic symbionts housed in the gills (within bacteriocytes), linking the mussel's success to vent chemistry and microbial metabolism.

== Description ==
Bathymodiolus thermophilus is a very large mussel with a dark brown periostracum, growing to a length of about 20 cm (8 in). It is attached to rocks on the seabed by byssus threads but it is able to detach itself and move to a different location. It is sometimes very abundant, having been recorded at densities of up to 300 individuals per square metre (270 per square yard).

== Distribution ==
Bathymodiolus thermophilus is found clustered around deep sea thermal vents on the East Pacific Rise between 13°N and 22°S and in the nearby Galapagos Rift at depths around 2800 metres (one and a half miles).

Deep sea hydrothermal vents are frequently found along tectonic plate boundaries, and underwater mountain ranges and ridges. They are particularly well dispersed along the global mid-ocean ridge system. Specific geographical barriers exist along the mid-ocean ridge system that may impede gene flow between populations along the ridge-axis. A study sampled mussels across various topographical interruptions along the ridge system and localities encompassed the Galapagos Rift and the East Pacific Rise. Results determined that mussel populations that were geographically isolated from one another via the Easter Microplate, known for its strong cross-axis currents, were genetically more divergent than populations from the Galapagos Rift and the East Pacific Rise, where there are no barriers to dispersal and no isolation-by-distance. Mussels in these populations were genetically homogeneous and contained high levels of unimpeded interpopulational gene flow.

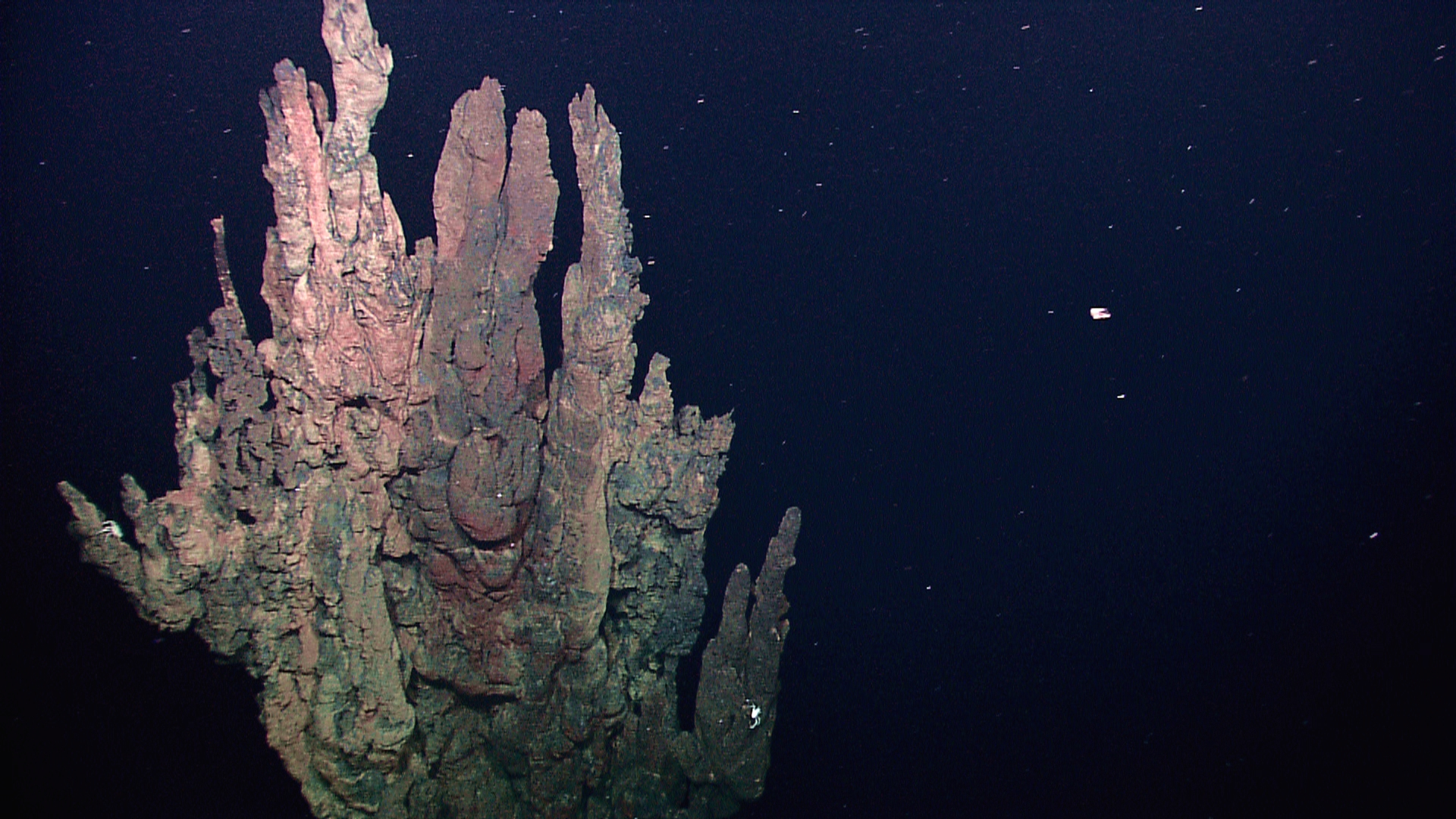
Example of a hydrothermal vent found in the depths of the Galapagos Rift.

The environments surrounding hydrothermal vents are important for the B. thermophilus to survive. It has been shown that environmental changes can impair the ability of the mussels and their symbiotic bacteria to live. Research has shown that when the B. thermophilus are experimentally placed in a low-sulfide environment, the gill symbionts are lost, and the mussels suffer harm to the gills and body conditions.

The distribution of B. thermophilus along hydrothermal events has an impact on the biodiversity in the environment. High-density mussel populations can directly inhibit the recruitment of invertebrates at deep-sea hydrothermal vents. When researchers transplanted B. thermophilus to a naturally high density hydrothermal vent, there was a lower recruitment at the hydrothermal vent in just 11 months. A potential reason for this phenomenon is due to enhanced predation or avoidance of superior competitors.

B. thermophilus grows opportunistically, capable of settling anywhere from the periphery of hydrothermal vent fields to directly on top of the tubes of giant tubeworms (Riftia pachyptila), where they may inhibit the growth of smaller tubeworms. This flexibility may be due to their ability to filter feed in addition to chemosynthesis; additionally, they are apparently known to colonize deployed scientific equipment within hours of their placement, showcasing their high mobility.

== Life cycle ==
The larvae of Bathymodiolus thermophilus drift with the currents and are planktotrophic, feeding on phytoplankton and small zooplankton. This method of feeding is likely to give them good dispersal capabilities and it has been shown by DNA analysis that there is a high rate of gene flow between populations round different vents.

The Bathymodiolus species represents one of the most well-known fauna to colonize hydrothermal vents and cold seeps. In particular, B. thermophilus has been extensively studied due to their chemosynthetic symbioses and their crucial roles in ecosystem productivity. In early stages of development, deep-sea mussels appear to follow similar growth processes of gametogenesis in comparison to shallow-water mytilidae. It has been observed that Bathymodiolins produce small oocytes which may predict high fecundity levels for this species. While there are limited studies regarding fecundity of B. thermophilus, one way to improve understanding of both fecundity as well as spawning patterns would to observe a spawning event with use of yearly sampling.

Adult stages of the bathymodioline species have received the most attention, especially when studying the bacterial symbionts that are fundamental to the mussels nutritional needs. When reaching maturity, adults form close aggregations along seeps and vents.

The mantle of B. thermophilus serves two physiological roles, one being the accumulation of somatic reserves, and the other being the development of the gonads. Gonads likely originate from germinal stem cells that appear in germinal stem-cell clumps around the dorsal region, between the mantle and the gill of the animal. In larger adult specimens, gonads can extend along the mantle epithelium. Gametogenesis occurs in small saclike cavity in a matrix of connective tissue supplied with seminal cells. In males, sertoli cells deliver nutrients to the developing gametes, where follicle cells perform the analogous role in female mussels.

== Symbiosis and feeding ==
Bathymodiolus thermophilus feeds by extracting suspended food particles from the surrounding water through its gills. This mostly consists of the bacteria that live around the vent, often forming a dense mat. As a result, B. thermophilus possesses a primary chemosymbiotic relationship with a Gammaproteobacteria that oxidizes hydrogen sulfide in the mussel's gills. The mussel absorbs nutrients synthesized by bacteria and is not reliant on photosynthetically produced organic matter. The bacteria lacks enzymes used to synthesize succinate and tricarboxylic acid cycle intermediates, but is able to synthesize nutrients by using sulfur coming from the vent. The sulfur is then used by these symbionts to produce organic compounds, which then are supplied to the host as nutrients. The genome of the bacteria reveals that it possesses pathways for the sulfide energy source and encodes cycles for CO_{2} fixation. Only mussels that contain high concentrations of bacteria demonstrated the ability to perform CO_{2} fixation. The bacteria also contain genes for cell surface adhesion, bacteriotoxicity, and phage immunity. These genetic characteristics may help the chemosynthetic bacteria defend against the B. thermophilus' immune system, which allows for the bacteria to live in the mussels' gills without being killed.

In addition to intracellular gill symbionts, bathymodiolin mussels can also associate with other bacteria on gill surfaces. Across vent and seep Bathymodiolus species, a specific clade of Epsilonproteobacteria has been reported as filamentous epibionts on the gill surface. These epibiotic associations have been discussed as potentially involved in sulfur-based metabolism or protective interactions, although specific functions remain unresolved.

Not only does the chemosymbiotic relationship between B. thermophilus and the bacteria benefit the mussel, but there is some speculation that living inside the gills of the mussel also benefits the bacteria. It is possible that living within another host helps the bacteria withstand the harsh environment of the hydrothermal vents. Because symbionts depend on reduced chemicals supplied by venting, host condition can track local hydrothermal activity. After disturbance and during reestablishment at vent site, growth patterns and body condition can reflect strong environmental variability (for example, semidiurnal fluctuations in oxygen, pH, intermittent sulfide, and temperature) that can constrain biomass accumulation.

Related Bathymodiolus species from cold seeps show dual symbiosis, with both methane-oxidizing and sulfur-oxidizing symbionts occurring with gill bacteriocytes and occupying different regions within gill cells. This suggests that bathymodiolin mussels can maintain multiple symbiont types and that symbiont composition can track local geochemistry.

== Evolution and phylogeny ==
Analysis of DNA sequence data posited that mussels of subfamily Bathymodiolinae were divided into four groups. B. thermophilus belongs to Group 2, along with four other species: B. septemdierum, B. brevior, and B. marisindicus. All members of Group 2 subspecies were labelled as thioautotrophs, chemoautotrophic organisms that feed on sulfides. Sequence data provided evidence for an outgroup of Modioline species from sunken wood and whale carcasses and that the phylogeny of Bathymodiolus mussels and their relatives had derivations from a single ancestor with COI (cytochrome C oxidase subunit I) or ND4 (NADH dehydrogenase subunit 4) sequence data.

Syntheses of lifecycle ecology and symbiosis frame the group as one of the most successful lineages to colonize hydrothermal vents and cold seeps, with chemosynthetic partnerships providing a major route to productivity in the deep sea.
