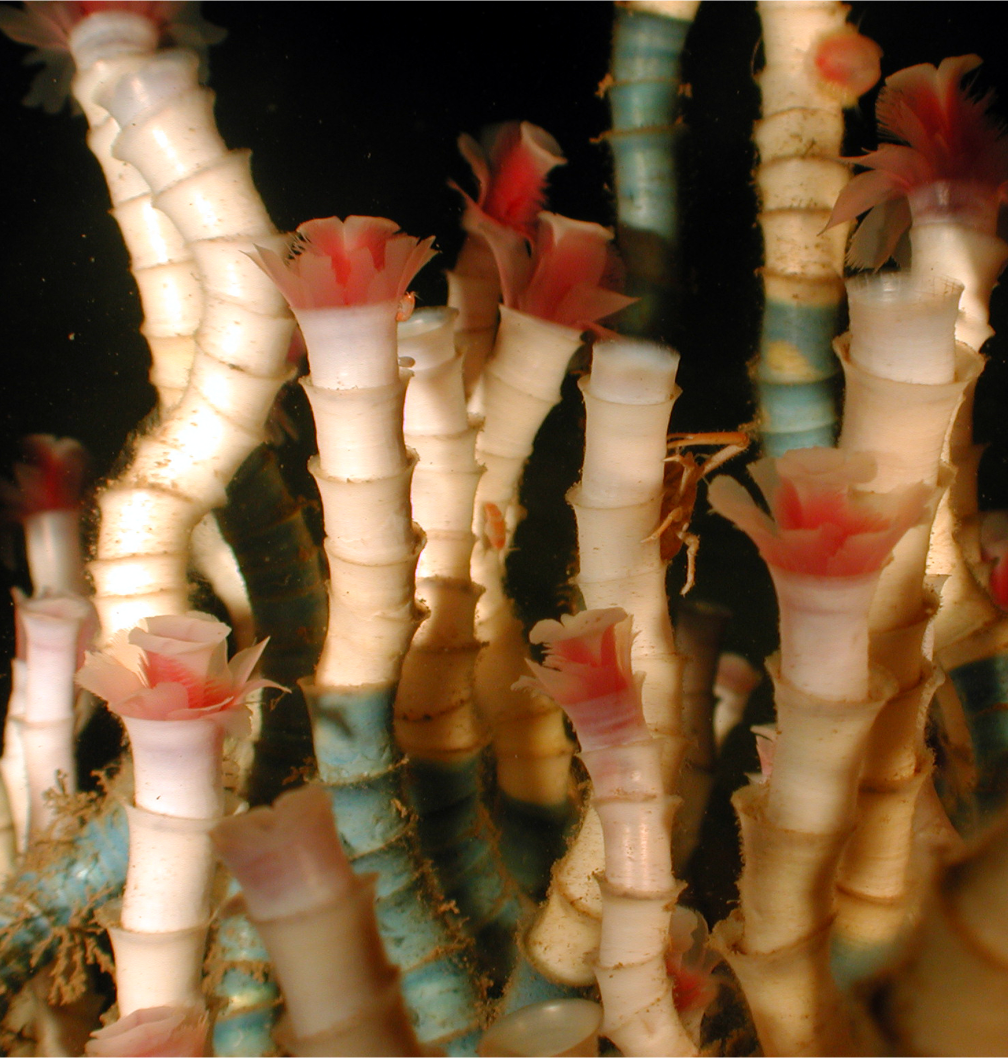

Scientific classification
- Kingdom: Animalia
- Phylum: Annelida
- Clade: Pleistoannelida
- Clade: Sedentaria
- Order: Sabellida
- Family: Siboglinidae
- Genus: Lamellibrachia
- Species: L. luymesi

Binomial name
- Lamellibrachia luymesi van der Land & Nørrevang, 1975

= Lamellibrachia luymesi =

Species of tube worms in the family Siboglinidae

Lamellibrachia luymesi is a species of tube worms in the family Siboglinidae. It lives at deep-sea cold seeps where hydrocarbons (oil and methane) are leaking out of the seafloor. It is entirely reliant on internal, sulfide-oxidizing bacterial symbionts for its nutrition. These are located in a centrally located "trophosome".

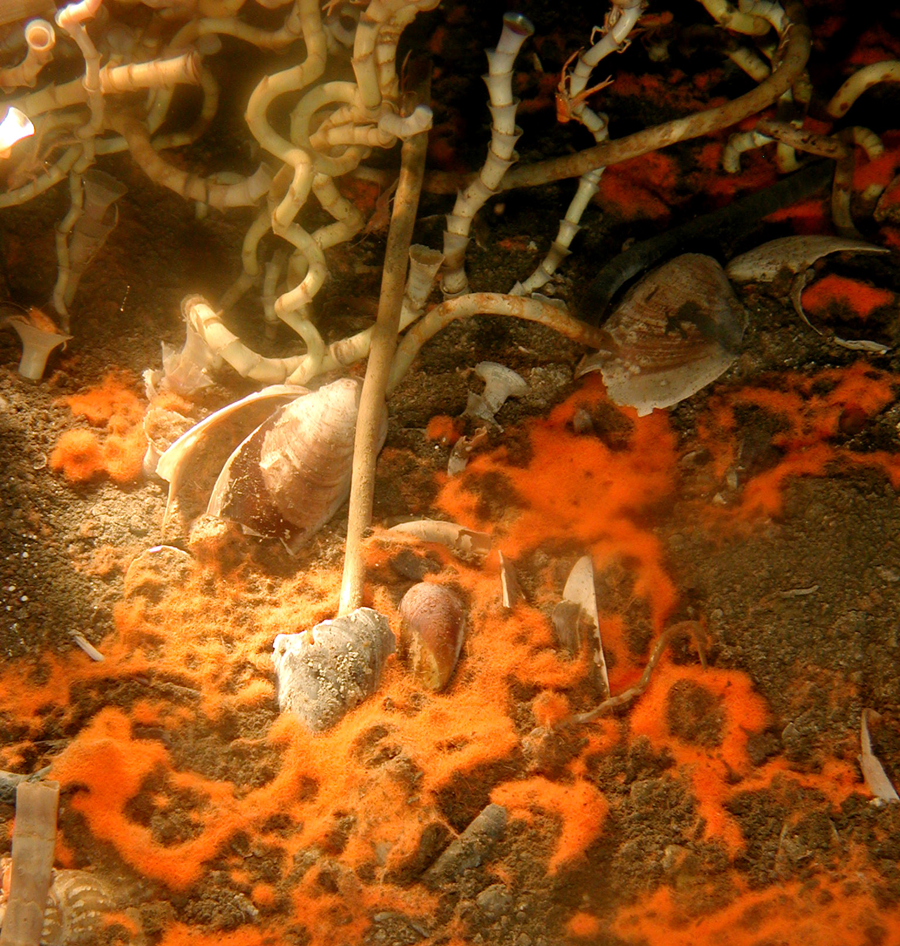
Symbiotic vestimentiferan tubeworm Lamellibrachia luymesi from a cold seep at 550 m depth in the Gulf of Mexico: In the sediments around the base are orange bacterial mats of the sulfide-oxidizing bacteria Beggiatoa spp. and empty shells of various clams and snails, which are also common inhabitants of the seeps.

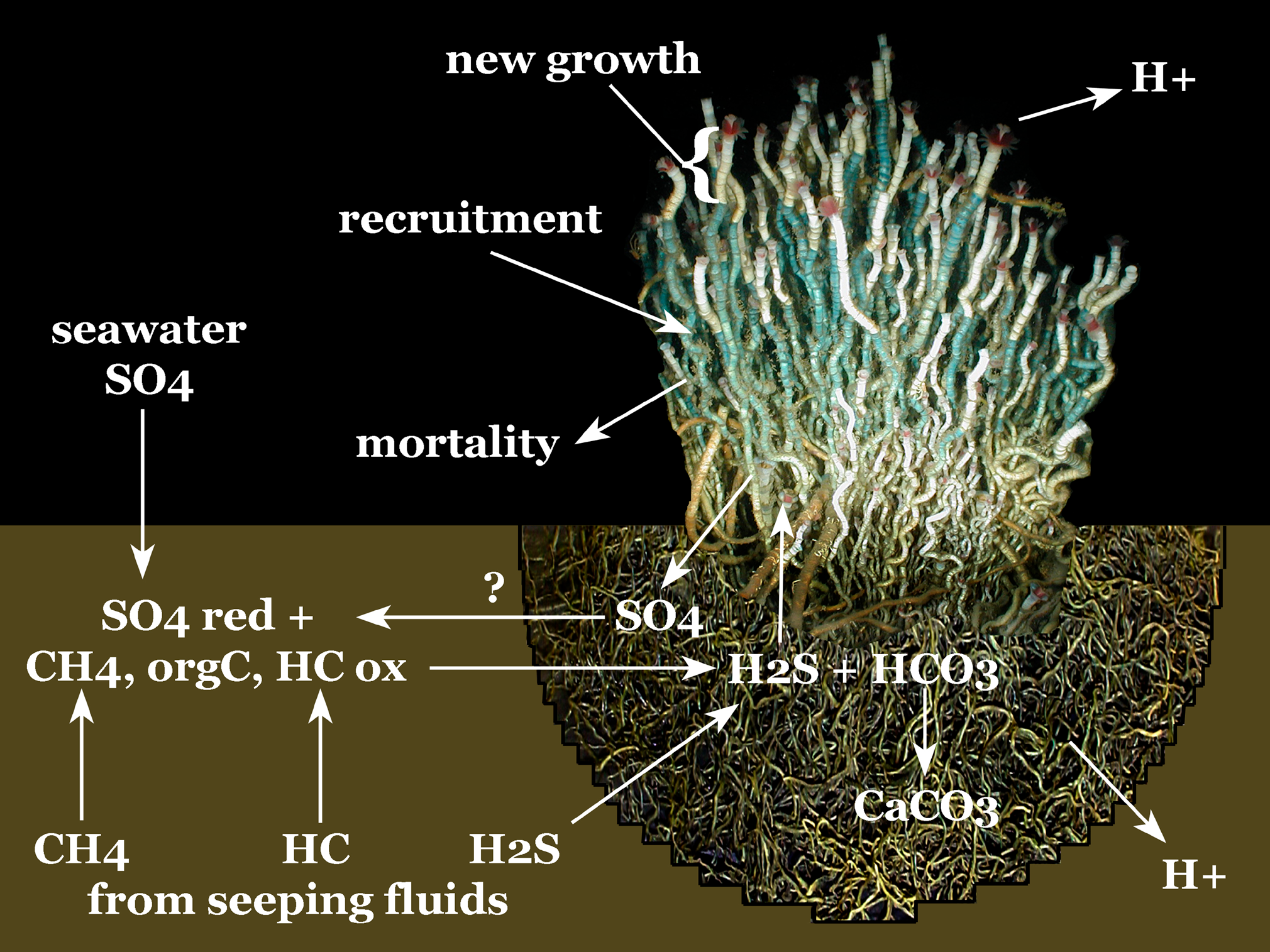
Model of Lamellibrachia luymesi include advection and diffusion of sulfate, sulfide, methane, bicarbonate, and hydrogen ions, as well as organic carbon content of sediments.

Lamellibrachia luymesi provides the bacteria with hydrogen sulfide and oxygen by taking them up from the environment and binding them to a specialized hemoglobin molecule. Unlike the tube worms Riftia pachyptila that live at hydrothermal vents, L. luymesi uses a posterior extension of its body called the root to take up hydrogen sulfide from the seep sediments. L. luymesi may also help fuel the generation of sulfide by excreting sulfate through their roots into the sediments below the aggregations.

To support the carbon fixation they need for maintenance and growth, L. luymesi needs to extract sulfide, oxygen, and inorganic carbon from its environment and supply them to its symbionts in the trophosome via the vascular system. It also needs to ensure that no build up of the sulfate and hydrogen ion waste products occurs, which would inhibit the bacterial activity. Laboratory experiments have shown that although some of the waste products diffuse into the water column, about 85% of the sulfate produced and about 67% of the hydrogen ions are eliminated across the roots.

The most well-known seeps where L. luymesi lives are in the northern Gulf of Mexico from 500 to 800 m depth. This tube worm can reach lengths over 3 m (10 ft), and grows very slowly, and its longevity is over 250 years. It forms biogenic habitat by creating large aggregations of hundreds to thousands of individuals. Hydrogen sulfide can be lethal for many marine organisms, and the tubeworms help minimise the sulfide levels and maintain a stable habitat. Living in these aggregations are over 100 different species of animals, including brachiopods, molluscs, sponges, arthropoda, and chordates, many of which are found only at these seeps.

== Reproduction ==
L. luymesi, is a dioecious vestimentiferan. Though detailed observations of L. luymesi's mating behaviors are lacking, the anatomical structures suggest adaptations for sexual reproduction. The female vestimentiferans' reproductive system opens anteriorly, amid the vestimental wings. Then meandering oviducts course through the trunk enveloped by trophosome tissue. In L. luymesi, the gonad occupies the anterior two-thirds of the trunk, featuring paired gonocoels housing ovaries running parallel and dorsal to the oviducts. These gonocoels posteriorly bend, transitioning into paired oviducts.

Research has shown that the sperm bundles of both Riftia pachyptila and L. luymesi are analogous. It has been found that fertilization in R. pachyptila is generally internal.

== Habitat and distribution ==
Lamellibrachia luymesi is primarily found in the Gulf of Mexico at depths ranging from 400 to 800 meters. They inhabit cold seep environments, which are areas where hydrocarbons seep out of the ocean floor.

== Ecology and behaviour ==
Lamellibrachia luymesi relies on a symbiotic relationship with sulfide-oxidizing bacteria for nutrition. The bacteria reside in the worm's trophosome, allowing it to exploit the chemical energy available at cold seeps. These tube worms can live for over 250 years, making them one of the longest-living non-colonial animals known.

== Discovery and taxonomy ==
Lamellibrachia luymesi was first described in 1983 by Webb. The species was named after the Dutch biologist, Charles Luyme.

== Conservation status ==
There is currently limited information on the conservation status of Lamellibrachia luymesi. However, cold seep environments are susceptible to damage from deep-sea drilling and trawling.
