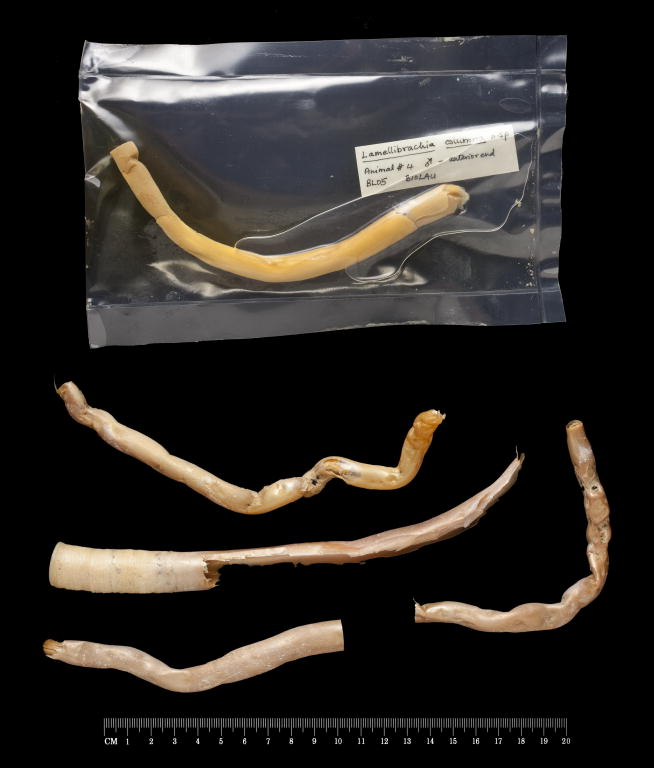
- Lamellibrachia columna

Scientific classification
- Kingdom: Animalia
- Phylum: Annelida
- Clade: Pleistoannelida
- Clade: Sedentaria
- Order: Sabellida
- Family: Siboglinidae
- Genus: Lamellibrachia
- Species: L. columna

Binomial name
- Lamellibrachia columna Southward, 1991

= Lamellibrachia columna =

Species of tube worms in the family Siboglinidae

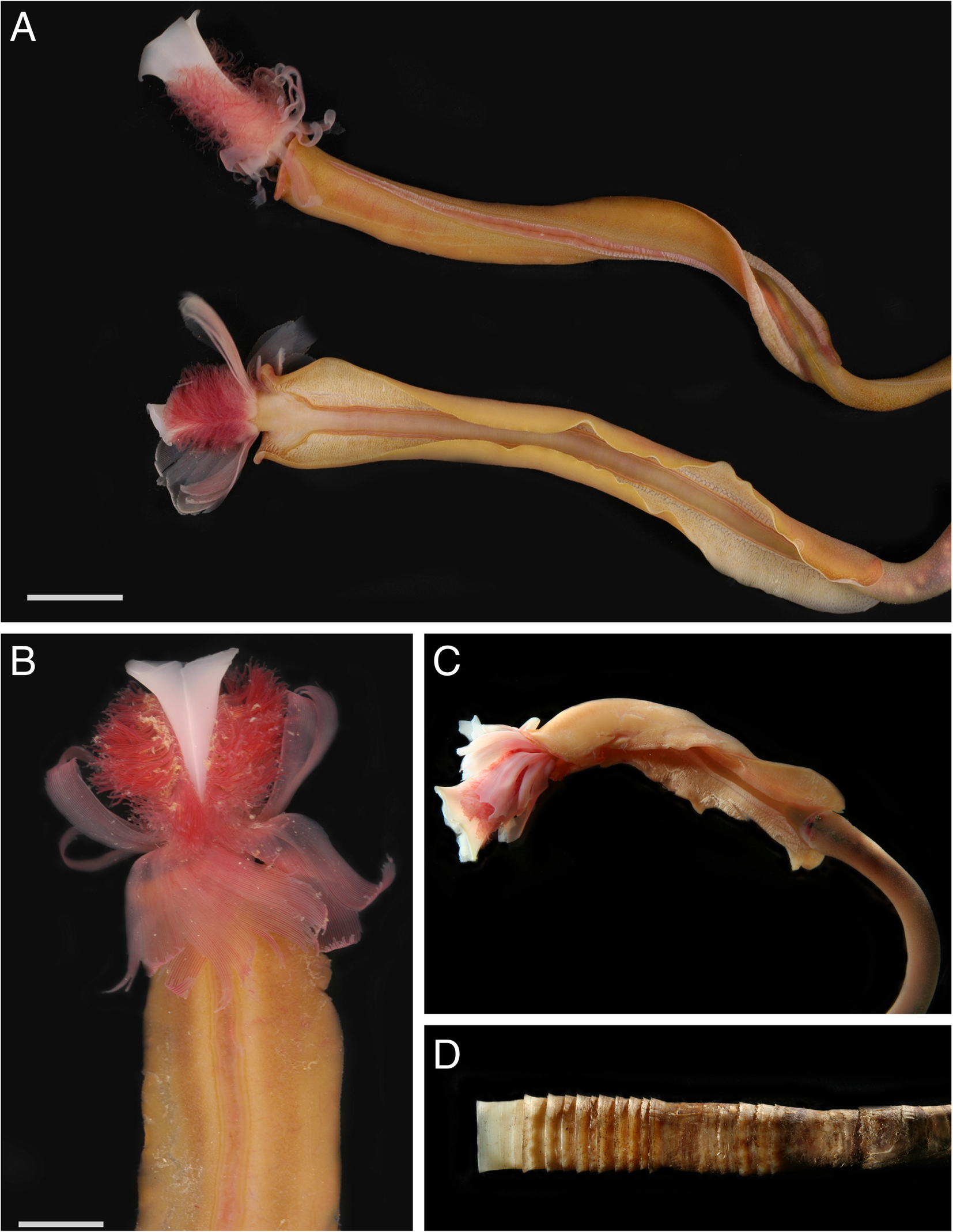
In situ photographs of Lamellibrachia columna. a Ventral (top) and dorsal (bottom) anterior of two L. columna specimens (scale bar represents 10 mm). b Ventral anterior of L. columna (scale bar represents 5 mm). c Dorsal anterior of L. columna d L. columna tube anterior

Lamellibrachia columna is a vestimentiferan tube worm from the South Pacific Ocean that has been shown to be very closely related genetically to Lamellibrachia satsuma found in Japanese waters.
