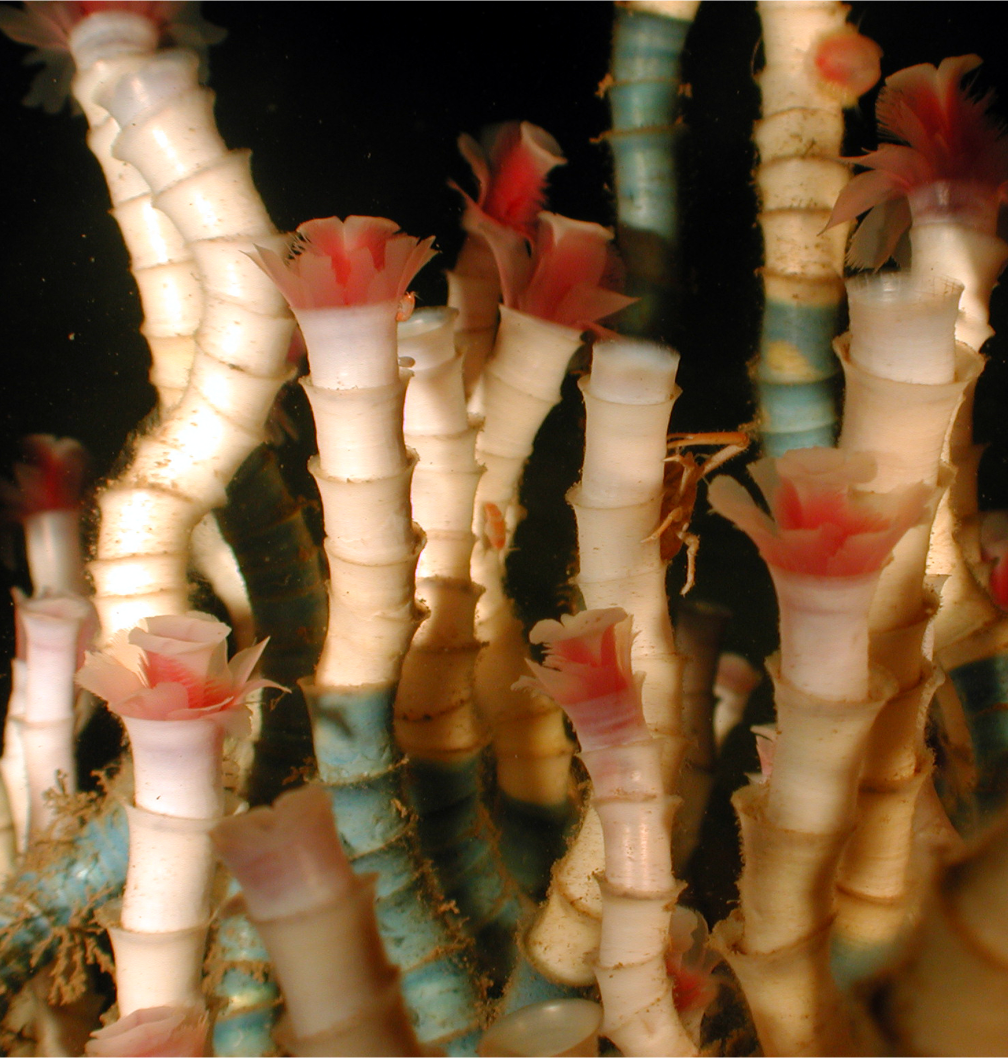
- Lamellibrachia luymesi

Scientific classification
- Kingdom: Animalia
- Phylum: Annelida
- Clade: Pleistoannelida
- Clade: Sedentaria
- Order: Sabellida
- Family: Siboglinidae
- Genus: Lamellibrachia; Webb, 1969

Type species
- Lamellibrachia barhami Webb, 1969

Species
- Lamellibrachia luymesi, Lamellibrachia satsuma, see text

= Lamellibrachia =

Genus of annelids

Lamellibrachia is a genus of tube worms related to the giant tube worm, Riftia pachyptila. They live at deep-sea cold seeps where hydrocarbons (oil and methane) leak out of the seafloor, and are entirely reliant on internal, sulfide-oxidizing bacterial symbionts for their nutrition. The symbionts, gammaproteobacteria, require sulfide and inorganic carbon (carbon dioxide). The tube worms extract dissolved oxygen and hydrogen sulfide from the sea water with the crown of plumes. Species living near seeps can also obtain sulfide through their "roots", posterior extensions of their body and tube. Several sorts of hemoglobin are present in the blood and coelomic fluid to bind to the different components and transport them to the symbionts.

L. luymesi provides the bacteria with hydrogen sulfide and oxygen by taking them up from the environment and binding them to a specialized hemoglobin molecule. Unlike the tube worms that live at hydrothermal vents, L. luymesi uses a posterior extension of its body called the root to take up hydrogen sulfide from the seep sediments. L. luymesi may also help fuel the generation of sulfide by excreting sulfate through its root into the sediments below the aggregations.

The most well-known seeps where L. luymesi lives are in the northern Gulf of Mexico from 500 to 800 m depth. This tube worm can reach lengths over 3 m (10 ft), and grows very slowly, with individuals living to be over 250 years old. It forms a biodiverse habitat by creating large aggregations of hundreds to thousands of individuals. Living in these aggregations are over 100 different species of animals, many of which are found only at these depths.

While most species of vestimentiferan tubeworms live in deep waters below the photic zone, L. satsuma was discovered in Kagoshima Bay, Kagoshima at a depth of only 82 m, the shallowest depth record for a vestimentiferan.

== Species ==
The following species are included in this genus:

- Lamellibrachia anaximandri Southward, Andersen & Hourdez, 2011
- Lamellibrachia barhami Webb, 1969
- Lamellibrachia columna Southward, 1991
- Lamellibrachia donwalshi McCowin & Rouse, 2018
- Lamellibrachia juni Miura & Kojima, 2006
- Lamellibrachia luymesi van der Land & Nørrevang, 1975
- Lamellibrachia satsuma Miura, 1997
- Lamellibrachia victori Mañe-Garzon & Montero, 1985
