= Pythia's Oasis =

Cold seep off the coast of Oregon

Pythia's Oasis is a cold seep on the ocean floor 50 miles (80 km) off the coast of Newport, Oregon, United States (44°29′00″N 125°4′00″W), characterized by a focused stream of highly altered fluid that is approximately 9 °C (16 °F) above normal ocean background temperature. Early results indicate "elevated flow rates" sustained for about 1,500 years.

The properties of the seep are unique for the Cascadia region and include extreme enrichment of boron and lithium and depletion of chloride, potassium, and magnesium.

The team discovered that the fluid was originating 2.5 miles (4.0 km) beneath the seafloor from the Cascadian megathrust, effectively regulating stress on the offshore fault.

== History ==
The site was discovered in 2015 by Brendan Philip, a University of Washington graduate who was tracking methane bubbles on the edge of the continental shelf, in which he used the remotely operated underwater vehicle ROPOS to collect samples for testing. The team described it as a "spring of low-salinity, high-temperature, mineral-rich water." The area is thriving with life, including rockfish, eelpout, hagfish, sea anemones, sea cucumbers, crabs, snails, soft corals, and clams.

It gained increased attention in 2023 following speculation that the site could contribute to a magnitude-9.0 earthquake.
