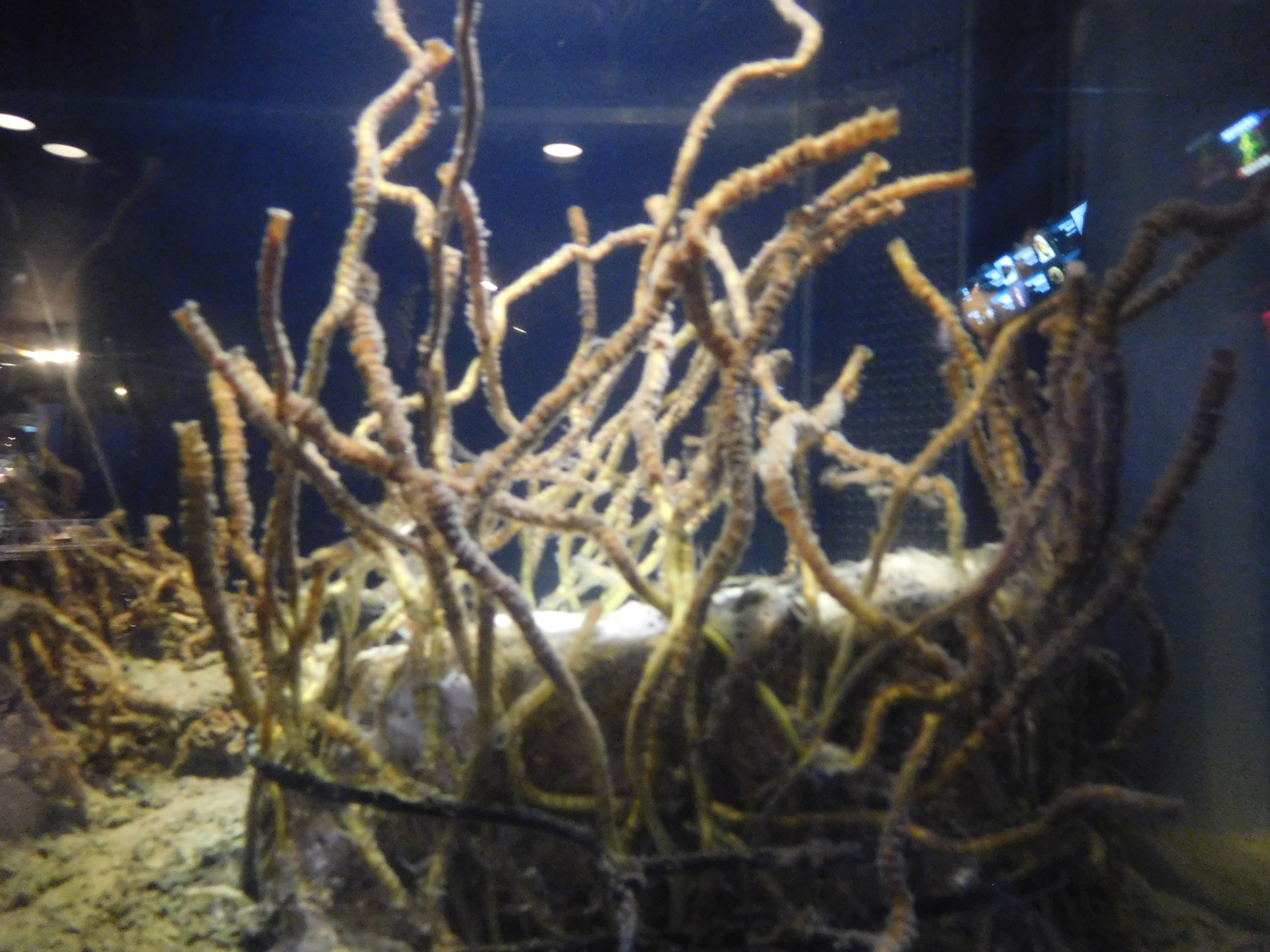
- Lamellibrachia satsuma

Scientific classification
- Kingdom: Animalia
- Phylum: Annelida
- Clade: Pleistoannelida
- Clade: Sedentaria
- Order: Sabellida
- Family: Siboglinidae
- Genus: Lamellibrachia
- Species: L. satsuma

Binomial name
- Lamellibrachia satsuma Miura, 1997

= Lamellibrachia satsuma =

Species of tube worms in the family Siboglinidae

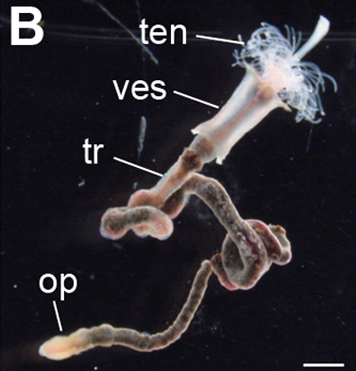
Lamellibrachia satsuma removed from its tube: ves = vestimentum, op = opisthosome, ten = tentacular region, tr = trunk

Lamellibrachia satsuma (also known as Satsuma tubeworm or Satsumahaorimushi or Satsuma Haorimushi (サツマハオリムシ)) is a vestimentiferan tube worm that was discovered near a hydrothermal vent in Kagoshima Bay, Kagoshima at the depth of only 82 m (269 ft) the shallowest depth record for a vestimentiferan. Its symbiotic sulfur oxidizer bacteria have been characterised as ε-Proteobacteria and γ-Proteobacteria. Subspecies have been later found associated with cold seeps at Hatsushima in Sagami Bay and at the Daini Tenryu Knoll in the Nankai Trough with specimens obtained at up to 1,170 m (3,840 ft) depth.

Lamellibrachia columna from the South Pacific Ocean has been shown to be very closely related genetically.
