= Lamellibrachia barhami =

Scientific classification
- Kingdom: Animalia
- Phylum: Annelida
- Clade: Pleistoannelida
- Clade: Sedentaria
- Order: Sabellida
- Family: Siboglinidae
- Genus: Lamellibrachia
- Species: L. barhami

Binomial name
- Lamellibrachia barhami Webb, 1969

Species of annelid

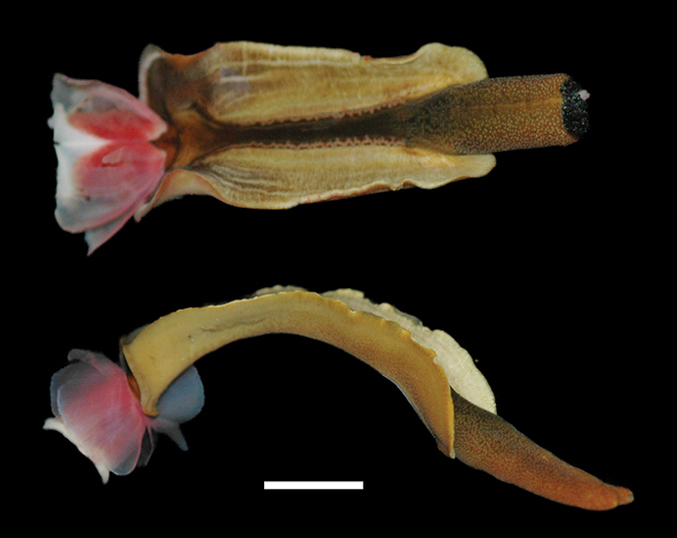
Lamellibrachia barhami (A1564, incomplete specimens). Scale bar: 1 cm.

Lamellibrachia barhami is a large pogonophore.

== Description ==
Its tentacular crown is formed of several, fused, horseshoe-shaped tentacle lamellae. The second segment has two body folds, near which open the genital ducts. The trunk, which comprises 89% of its total body length, is undifferentiated. The true metasoma is without setae. The heart is a simple muscular elaboration of the anterior end of the ventral blood vessel. The brain is large, and from it arises a pair of intraepidermal nerve cords, which extend the full length of the vestimental region; thereafter, they join and form the a nerve cord of the trunk. Associated with the brain and the nerve cords are the dorsal tubes.
