= San Diego Trough Fault Zone =

Group of strike-slip faults along the coast of California

- San Diego Trough, San Diego Trough Fault
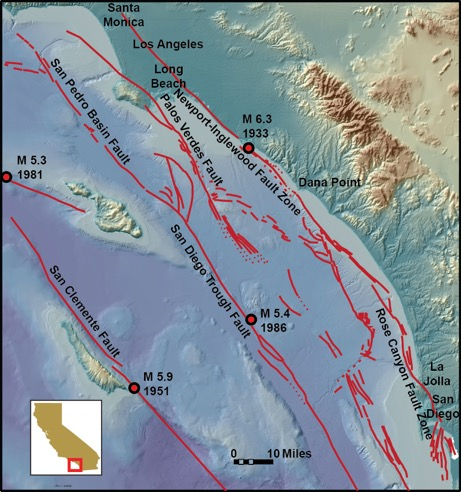
- The San Diego Trough Fault Zone relative to other offshore faults
- Etymology: San Diego, California
- Location: Offshore San Diego
- Country: United States
- State: California

Characteristics
- Part of: California continental borderland
- Length: 150–166 km (93–103 mi)

Tectonics
- Earthquakes: M_{s} 5.8 1986 Oceanside earthquake
- Type: Strike-slip

The San Diego Trough Fault Zone is a group of connected right-lateral strike-slip faults that run parallel to the coast of Southern California, United States, for 150–166 km (93–103 mi). The fault zone takes up 25% of the slip within the Inner Continental Borderlands. Portions of the fault get within 30 km (19 mi) of populated cities; however, the faults never reach shore. The north of the fault zone begins where the San Pedro Basin Fault Zone and the Santa Catalina Fault Zone meet, and the southern section terminates where it reaches the Bahía Soledad Fault. Seismic risk along the fault is high, with potential earthquake scenarios reaching up to magnitude 7.9 in the worst case. An earthquake of this size would devastate coastal areas.

== Tectonic background ==
California lies along the plate boundary between the North American plate and the Pacific plate. The San Andreas Fault system and the eastern California shear zone accommodate approximately 85% of the predominately strike-slip deformation. The rest of the plate motion is taken up by the California Continental Borderlands, which itself is broken up into two parts: the Outer Continental Borderlands and the Inner Continental Borderlands (ICB). The ICB is associated with various offshore faults near the shore. The San Diego Trough Fault Zone lies within this area and accommodates around 25% of the strain release of the ICB through faulting.

== Fault characteristics ==
The San Diego Trough Fault Zone extends for a distance of 150–166 km (93–103 mi). Strands of the fault get to within 30–35 km (19–22 mi) of San Diego and within 40 km (25 mi) of Tijuana. The northern part of the fault zone is complex, as it is the meeting point between two fault zones: the San Pedro Basin Fault Zone and the Santa Catalina Fault Zone. They bound the Santa Catalina island platform with the Santa Catalina Fault Zone running to the west, and the San Pedro Basin Fault Zone to the east. South of this tectonic block, they join together, and this forms the San Diego Trough Fault Zone. The next segment of fault runs narrow and straight for a distance of 100–150 km (62–93 mi) while roughly parallel to the coast. The fault zone continues south before merging with the Bahía Soledad fault off the coast of Baja California. Slip rate along the fault is estimated at 1.2–1.8 mm (0.047–0.071 in) per year, which makes up 25% of Inner Continental Borderlands slip.

== Seismic hazard and activity ==
Despite the San Diego Trough Fault Zone being a large and mature strike-slip fault system, it is poorly understood by researchers. However, it is thought that it is able to host large earthquakes capable of devastating southern California population centers, including the counties of Los Angeles, San Diego, and Orange. It has slipped in the Holocene period, which means it is recently active. Estimates predict a multi-segment rupture of the fault zone is capable of producing an earthquake of magnitude 7.6–7.9. An earthquake this large in such close proximity to densely populated southern California would be devastating. In 1986, a M_{s} 5.8 earthquake struck off the coast of Oceanside, killing 1 and injuring 29 more. As the event had a reverse faulting mechanism, it did not rupture the San Diego Trough Fault Zone itself; however, it did rupture a 20 km (12 mi) restraining step-over linking two fault zone segments. Aftershocks had varying focal mechanisms, with some as the result of reverse faulting within the step-over, and others as the result of strike-slip faulting.

== See also ==
- Elsinore Fault Zone
- Rose Canyon Fault
- San Jacinto Fault Zone
