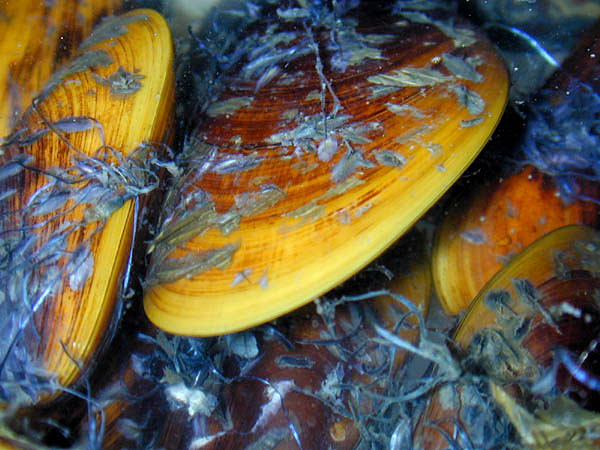
- Bathymodiolus childressi

Scientific classification
- Domain: Eukaryota
- Kingdom: Animalia
- Phylum: Mollusca
- Class: Bivalvia
- Order: Mytilida
- Family: Mytilidae
- Genus: Bathymodiolus; Kenk & Wilson, 1985

Species
- See text

= Bathymodiolus =

Genus of bivalves

Bathymodiolus is a genus of deep-sea mussels, marine bivalve molluscs in the family Mytilidae. Many of them contain intracellular chemoautotrophic bacterial symbionts.

== Species ==
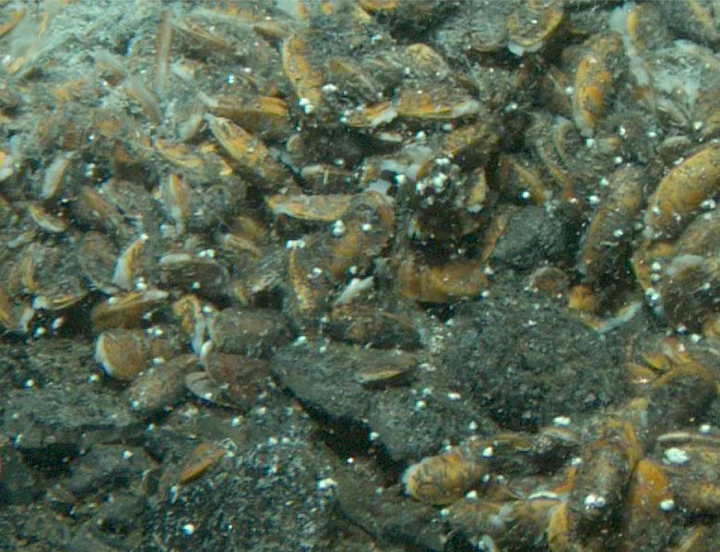
Bathymodiolus thermophilus

Modern (non-fossil) species within the genus Bathymodiolus include:

- Bathymodiolus childressi Gustafson, Lutz, Turner & Vrijenhoek, 1998
- Bathymodiolus japonicus Hashimoto & Okutani, 1994
- Bathymodiolus marisindicus Hashimoto, 2001
- Bathymodiolus platifrons Hashimoto & Okutani, 1994
- Bathymodiolus septemdierum Hashimoto & Okutani, 1994
- Bathymodiolus tangaroa Von Cossel & Marshall, 2003
- Bathymodiolus thermophilus Kenk & Wilson, 1985
- Bathymodiolus boomerang Cosel & Olu, 1998

There also are several fossil species, which are usually only tentatively assigned to hydrothermal vent and hydrocarbon seep-inhabiting mussel genera due to their conservative shell morphology and ongoing taxonomic revision of this group. They include:

- Bathymodiolus (sensu lato) heretaunga Saether, Little, Campbell, Marshall, Collins & Alfaro, 2010
- Bathymodiolus (sensu lato) inouei Amano & Jenkins, 2011
- Bathymodiolus palmarensis Kiel, Campbell & Gaillard, 2010
