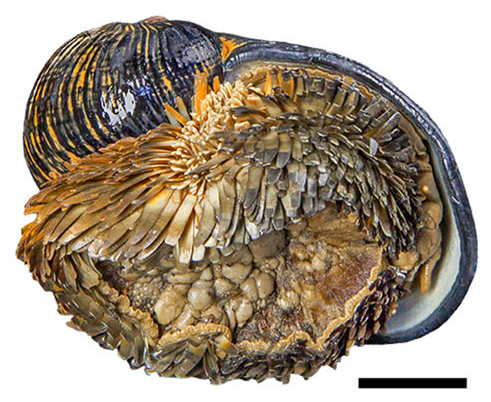
- Chrysomallon squamiferum from Longqi. Scale bar is 1 cm

Conservation status
- Endangered (IUCN 3.1)

Scientific classification
- Kingdom: Animalia
- Phylum: Mollusca
- Class: Gastropoda
- Subclass: Vetigastropoda
- Family: Peltospiridae
- Genus: Chrysomallon; Chen, Linse, Copley & Rogers, 2015
- Species: C. squamiferum

Binomial name
- Chrysomallon squamiferum Chen, Linse, Copley & Rogers, 2015

Synonyms
- Crysomallon squamiferum (orth. error)

= Scaly-foot gastropod =

Scaly-foot / Sea pangolin

Deep-sea gastropod

Chrysomallon squamiferum, commonly known as the scaly-foot gastropod, scaly-foot snail, sea pangolin, or volcano snail, is a species of deep-sea hydrothermal-vent snail, a marine gastropod mollusc in the family Peltospiridae. This vent-endemic gastropod is known only from deep-sea hydrothermal vents in the Indian Ocean, where it has been found at depths of about 2,400–2,900 m (1.5–1.8 mi). C. squamiferum differs greatly from other deep-sea gastropods, even the closely related neomphalines. In 2019, it was declared endangered on the IUCN Red List, the first species to be listed as such due to risks from deep-sea mining of its vent habitat.

The shell is of a unique construction, with three layers; the outer layer consists of iron sulphides, the middle layer is equivalent to the organic periostracum found in other gastropods, and the innermost layer is made of aragonite. The foot is also unusual, being armored at the sides with iron-mineralised sclerites.

The snail's oesophageal gland houses symbiotic gammaproteobacteria from which the snail appears to obtain its nourishment. This species is considered to be one of the most peculiar deep-sea hydrothermal-vent gastropods, and it is the only known extant animal that incorporates iron sulfide into its skeleton (into both its sclerites and into its shell as an exoskeleton). Its heart is, proportionately speaking, unusually large for any animal: the heart comprises approximately 4% of its body volume.

== Taxonomy ==
This species was first discovered in April 2001 and became known as the "scaly-foot" gastropod. The name Chrysomallon squamiferum came into use in 2003, though its formal description according to the International Code of Zoological Nomenclature was only published by Chen et al. in 2015. Type specimens are stored in the Natural History Museum, London. During the time when the name was not yet formalized, an incorrect spelling variant was "Crysomallon squamiferum".

Chrysomallon squamiferum is the type species and the sole species within the genus Chrysomallon. The generic name Chrysomallon is from the Ancient Greek language, and means "golden haired", because pyrite (a compound occurring in its shell) is golden in color. The specific name squamiferum is from the Latin language and means "scale-bearing", because of its sclerites. At first it was not known to which family this species belonged. Warén et al. classified this species in the family Peltospiridae, within the Neomphalina in 2003. Molecular analyses based on sequences of cytochrome-c oxidase I (COI) genes confirmed the placement of this species within the Peltospiridae. Morphotypes from two localities are dark; a morphotype from a third locality is white (see next section for explanation of localities). These different colored snails appear to be simply "varieties" of the same species, according to the results of genetic analysis.

== Distribution ==
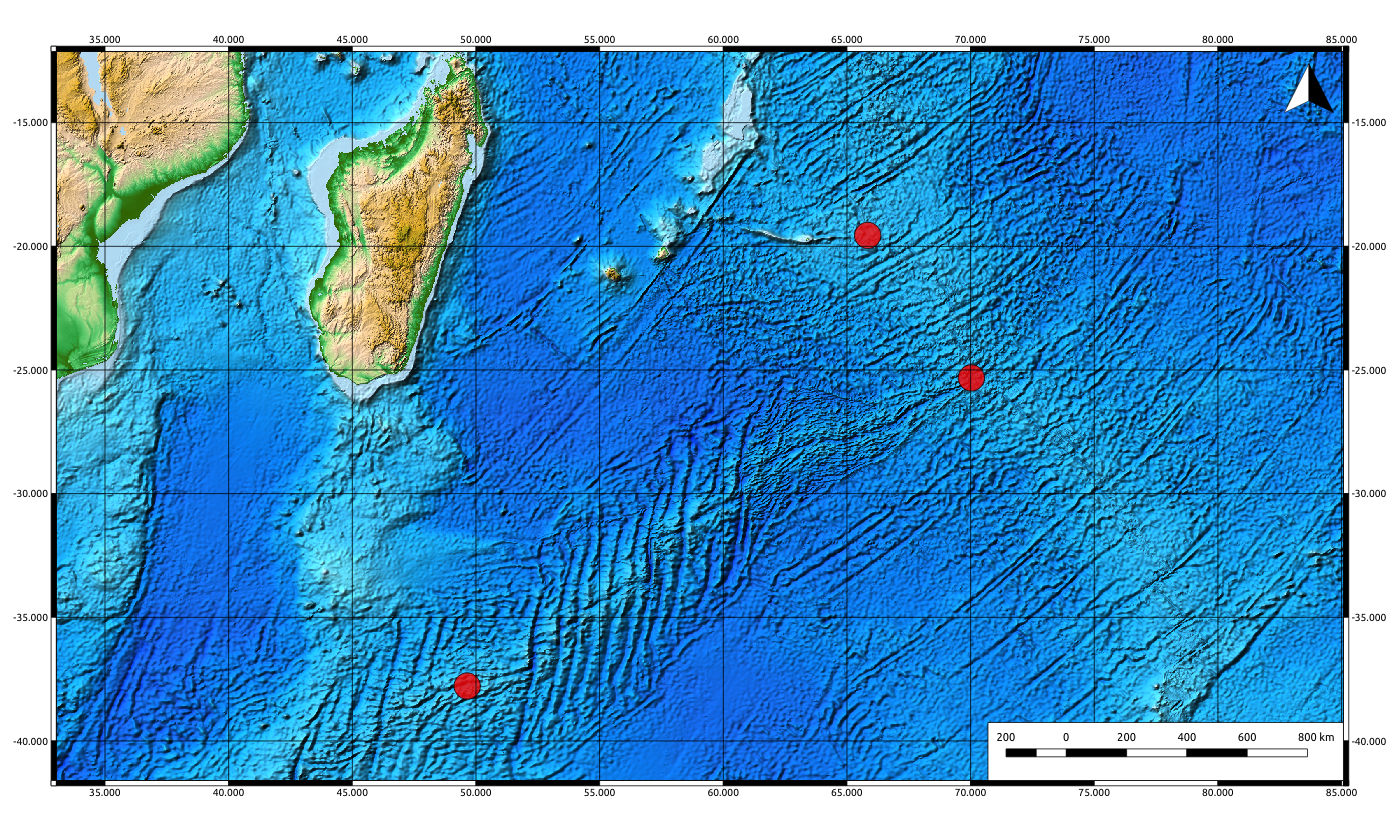
Distribution over the Indian Ocean

The scaly-foot gastropod is a vent-endemic gastropod known only from the deep-sea hydrothermal vents of the Indian Ocean, which are around 2,780 metres (1.73 mi) in depth. The species was discovered in 2001, living on the bases of black smokers in the Kairei hydrothermal vent field, 25°19.239′S 70°02.429′E, on the Central Indian Ridge, just north of the Rodrigues Triple Point. The species has subsequently also been found in the Solitaire field, 19°33.413′S 65°50.888′E, Central Indian Ridge, within the Exclusive Economic Zone of Mauritius and Longqi (means "Dragon flag" in Chinese) field, 37°47.027′S 49°38.963′E, Southwest Indian Ridge. Longqi field was designated as the type locality; all type material originated from this vent field. The distance between Kairei and Solitaire is about 700 km (430 mi). The distance between Solitaire and Longqi is about 2,500 km (1,600 mi). These three sites belong to the Indian Ocean biogeographic province of hydrothermal vent systems sensu Rogers et al. (2012). The distance between sites is large, but the total distribution area is very small, less than 0.02 square kilometres (0.0077 mi^{2}).

Peltospiridae snails are mainly known to live in Eastern Pacific vent fields. Nakamura et al. hypothesized that the occurrence of the scaly-foot gastropod in the Indian Ocean suggests a relationship of the hydrothermal vent faunas between these two areas.

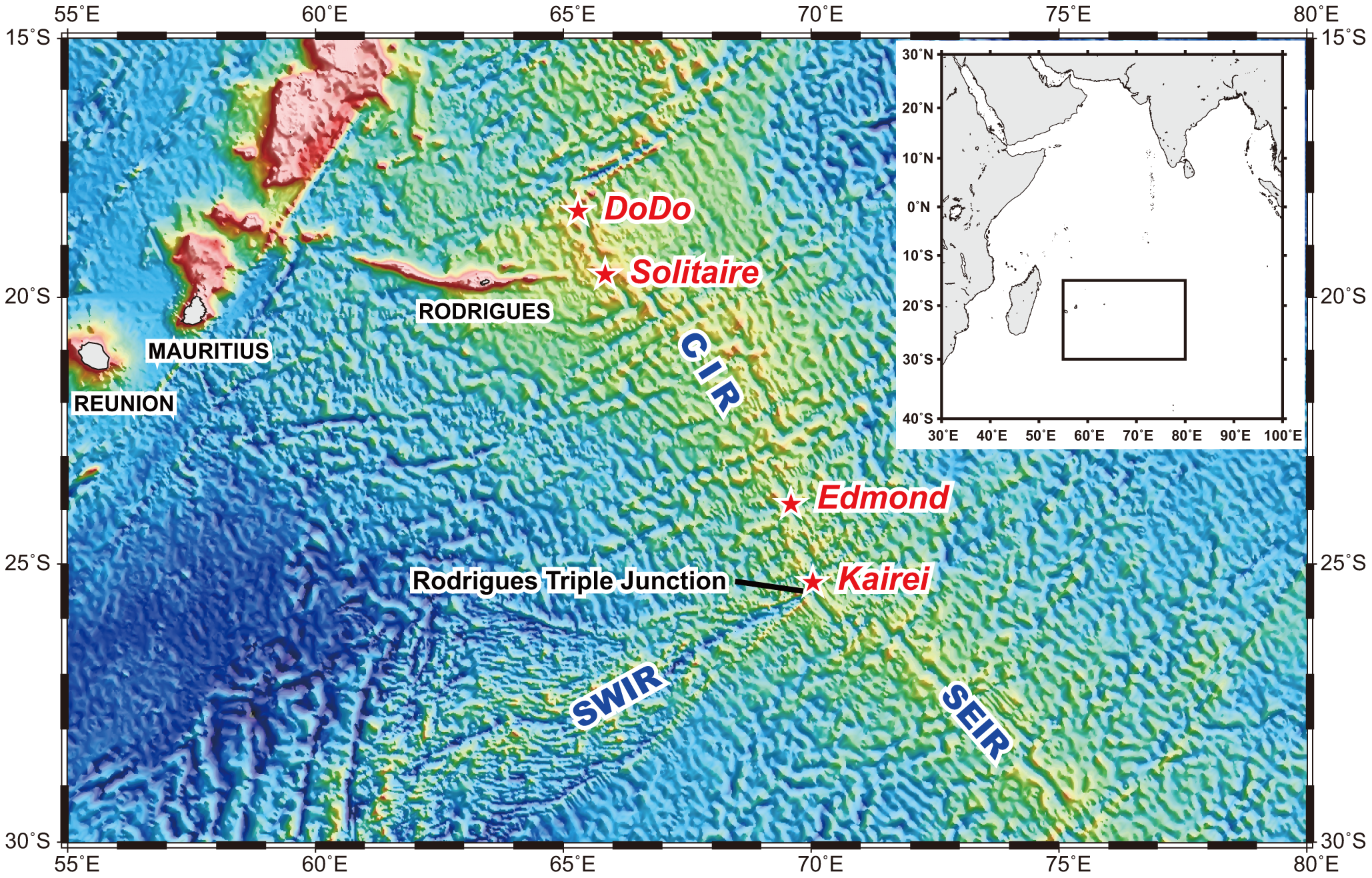
Map of southern part of the Central Indian Ridge (CIR) showing location of hydrothermal vent communities

Research expeditions have included:

- 2000 – an expedition of the Japan Agency for Marine-Earth Science and Technology using the ship RV Kairei and ROV Kaikō discovered the Kairei vent field, but scaly-foot gastropods were not found at that time. This was the first vent field discovered in the Indian Ocean.
- 2001 – an expedition of the U.S. research vessel RV Knorr with ROV Jason discovered scaly-foot gastropods in the Kairei vent field.
- 2007 – an expedition of RV Da Yang Yi Hao discovered the Longqi vent field.
- 2009 – an expedition of RV Yokosuka with DSV Shinkai 6500 discovered the Solitaire field and sampled scaly-foot gastropods there.
- 2009 – an expedition of RV Da Yang Yi Hao visually observed scaly-foot gastropods at Longqi vent field.
- 2011 – an expedition of the British Royal Research Ship RRS James Cook with ROV Kiel 6000 sampled the Longqi vent field.

== Description ==
=== Sclerites ===
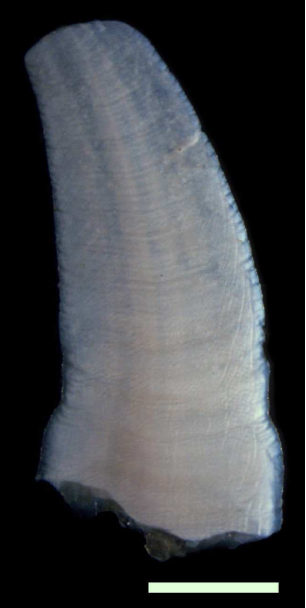
Outer surface of a single sclerite of C. squamiferum. The scale bar is 1 mm.

In this species, the sides of the snail's foot are extremely unusual, being armoured with hundreds of iron-mineralised sclerites; these are composed of iron sulfides including greigite and pyrite. Each sclerite has a soft epithelial tissue core, a conchiolin cover, and an uppermost layer containing pyrite and greigite. Prior to the discovery of the scaly-foot gastropod, it was thought that the only extant molluscs possessing scale-like structures were in the classes Caudofoveata, Solenogastres and Polyplacophora. Sclerites are not homologous to a gastropod operculum. The sclerites of the scaly-foot gastropod are also not homologous to the sclerites found in chitons (Polyplacophora). It has been hypothesized that the sclerites of Cambrian halwaxiids such as Halkieria may potentially be more analogous to the sclerites of this snail than are the sclerites of chitons or aplacophorans. As recently as 2015, detailed morphological analysis for testing this hypothesis had not been carried out.

The sclerites of C. squamiferum are mainly proteinaceous (conchiolin is a complex protein); in contrast, the sclerites of chitons are mainly calcareous. There are no visible growth lines of conchiolin in cross-sections of sclerites. No other extant or extinct gastropods possess dermal sclerites, and no other extant animal is known to use iron sulfides in this way, either in its skeleton, or exoskeleton.

The size of each sclerite is about 1 × 5 mm in adults. Juveniles have scales in few rows, while adults have dense and asymmetric scales. The Solitaire population of snails has white sclerites instead of black; this is due to a lack of iron in the sclerites. The sclerites are imbricated (overlapped in a manner reminiscent of roof tiles). The purpose of sclerites has been speculated to be protection or detoxification. The sclerites may help protect the gastropod from the vent fluid, so that its bacteria can live close to the source of electron donors for chemosynthesis. Or alternatively, the sclerites may result from deposition of toxic sulfide waste from the endosymbionts, and therefore represent a novel solution for detoxification. But the true function of sclerites is, as yet, unknown. The sclerites of the Kairei population, which have a layer of iron sulfide, are ferrimagnetic. The non-iron-sulfide-mineralized sclerite from the Solitaire morphotype showed greater mechanical strength of the whole structure in the three-point bending stress test (12.06 MPa) than did the sclerite from the Kairei morphotype (6.54 MPa).

In life, the external surfaces of sclerites host a diverse array of epibionts: Campylobacterota (formerly Epsilonproteobacteria) and Thermodesulfobacteriota (formerly part of Deltaproteobacteria). These bacteria probably provide their mineralization. Goffredi et al. (2004) hypothesized that the snail secretes some organic compounds that facilitate the attachment of the bacteria.

=== Shell ===
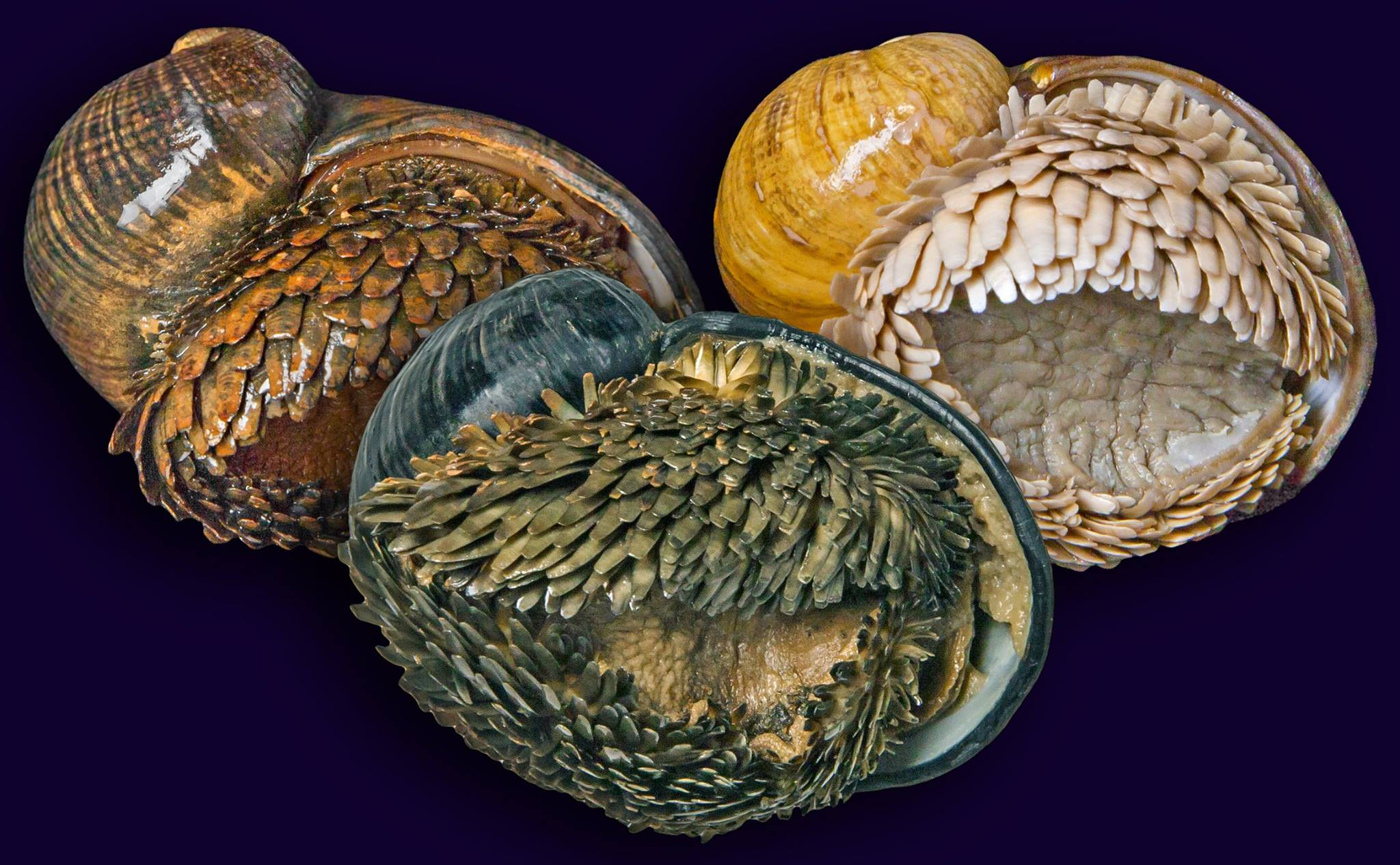
Individuals from the three known populations of C. squamiferum: Kairei, Longqi, Solitaire (left to right)

The shell of this species has three whorls. The shape of the shell is globose and the spire is compressed. The shell sculpture consists of ribs and fine growth lines. The shape of the aperture is elliptical. The apex of the shell is fragile and it is corroded in adults.

This is a very large peltospirid compared to the majority of other species, which are usually below 15 millimetres (3/5 in) in shell length. The width of the shell is 9.80–40.02 mm (0.39–1.58 in); the maximum width of the shell reaches 45.5 millimetres (1.79 in). The average width of the shell of adult snails is 32 mm. The average shell width in the Solitaire population was slightly less than that in the Kairei population. The height of the shell is 7.65–30.87 mm (0.30–1.22 in). The width of the aperture is 7.26–32.52 mm (0.29–1.28 in). The height of the aperture is 6.38–27.29 mm (0.25–1.07 in).

The shell structure consists of three layers. The outer layer is about 30 μm thick, black, and is made of iron sulfides, containing greigite Fe_{3}S_{4}. This species is the only extant animal known to feature this material in its skeleton. The middle layer (about 150 μm) is equivalent to the organic periostracum which is also found in other gastropods. The periostracum is thick and brown. The innermost layer is made of aragonite (about 250 μm thick), a form of calcium carbonate that is commonly found both in the shells of molluscs and in various corals. The color of the aragonite layer is milky white.

Each shell layer appears to contribute to the effectiveness of the snail's defence in different ways. The middle organic layer appears to absorb mechanical strain and energy generated by a squeezing attack (for example by the claws of a crab), making the shell much tougher. The organic layer also acts to dissipate heat. Features of this composite material are in focus of researchers for possible use in civilian and military protective applications.

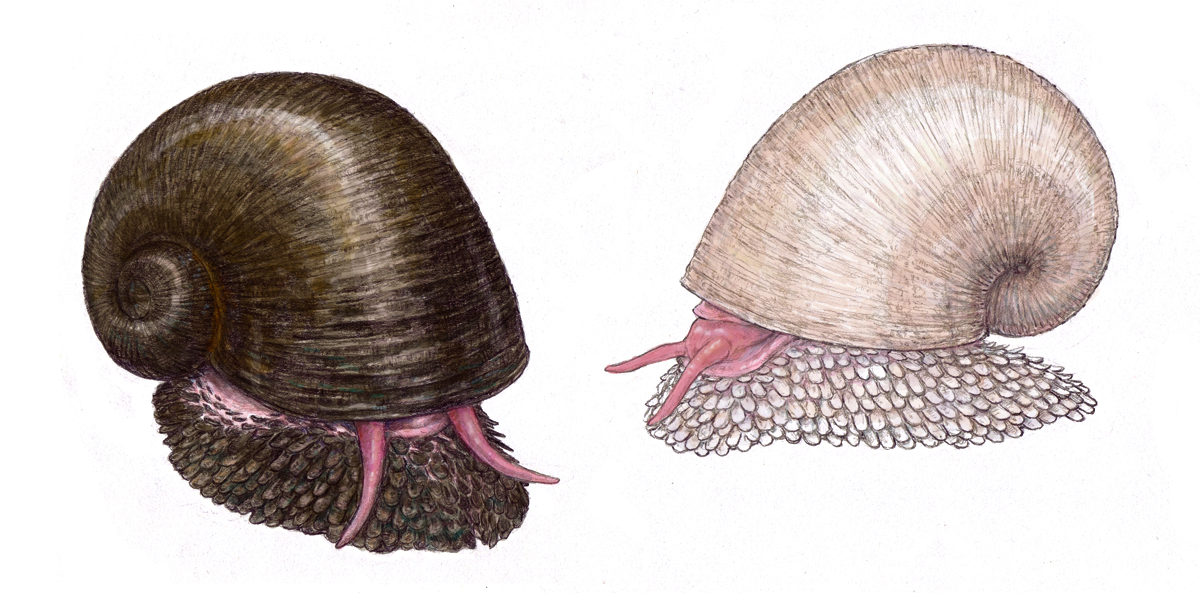
Two varieties of scaly-foot gastropod

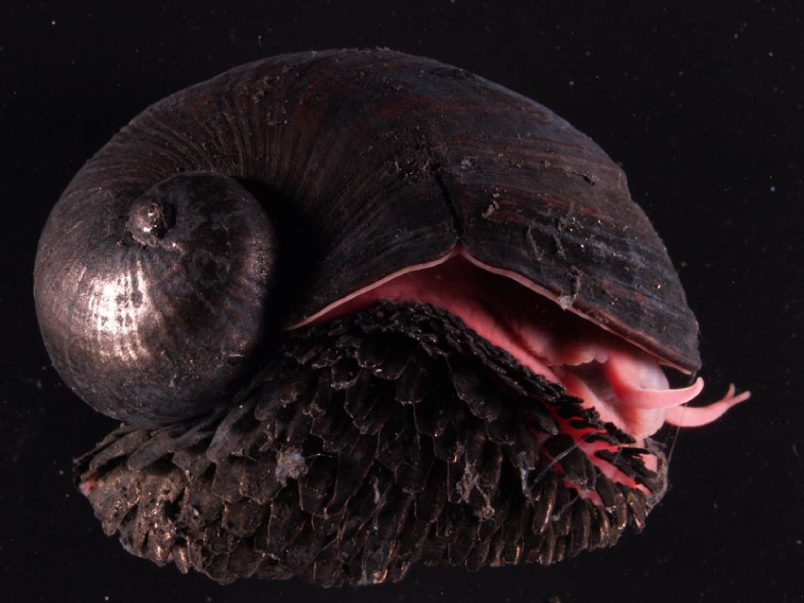
C. squamiferum from the Kairei vent field

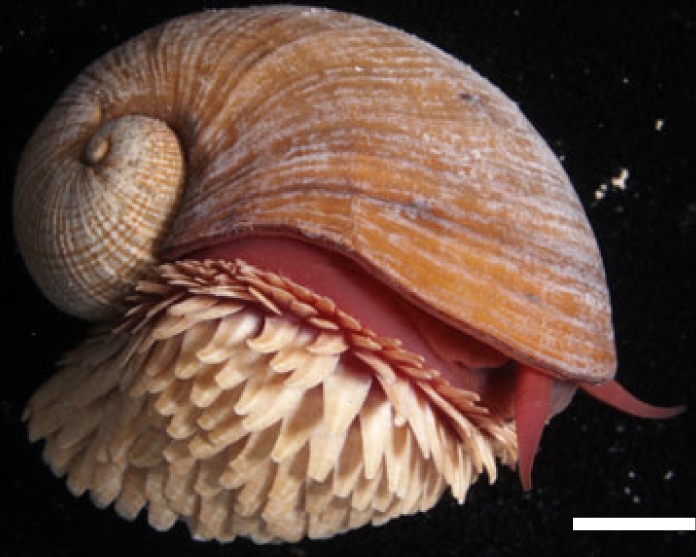
C. squamiferum from the Solitaire vent field

=== Operculum ===
In this species, the shape of the operculum changes during growth, from a rounded shape in juveniles to a curved shape in adults. The relative size of the operculum decreases as individuals grow. About a half of all adult snails of this species possess an operculum among the sclerites at the rear of the animal. It seems likely that the sclerites gradually grow and fully cover the whole foot for protection, and the operculum loses its protective function as the animal grows.

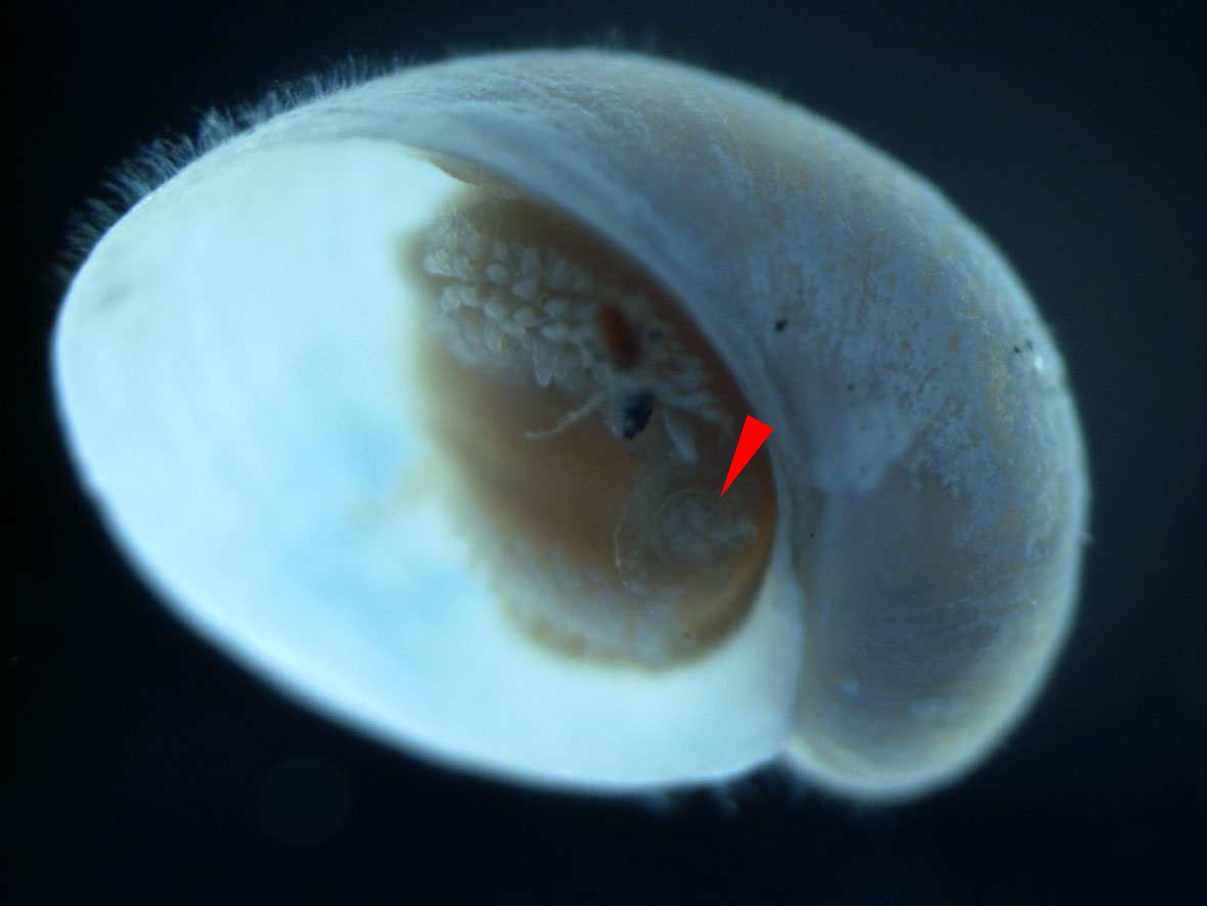
A juvenile with operculum indicated by the red pointer. The shell length is about 2 mm.

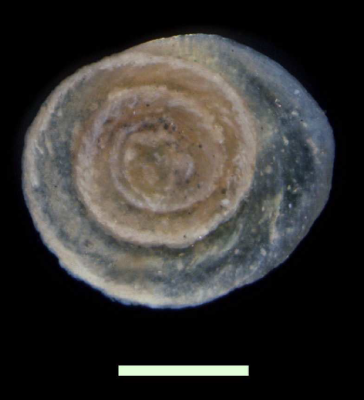
An operculum of a juvenile snail. The scale bar is 1 mm.

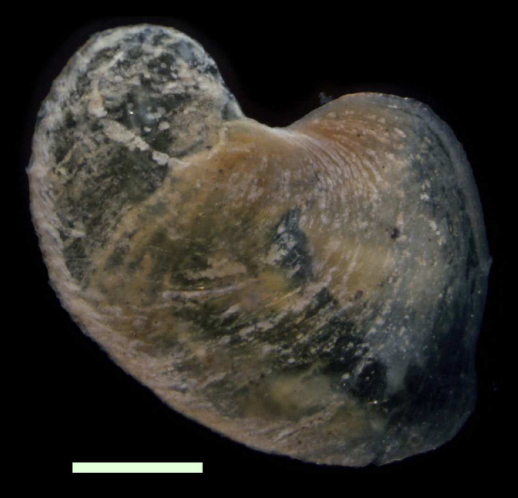
An operculum of an adult snail. The scale bar is 1 mm.

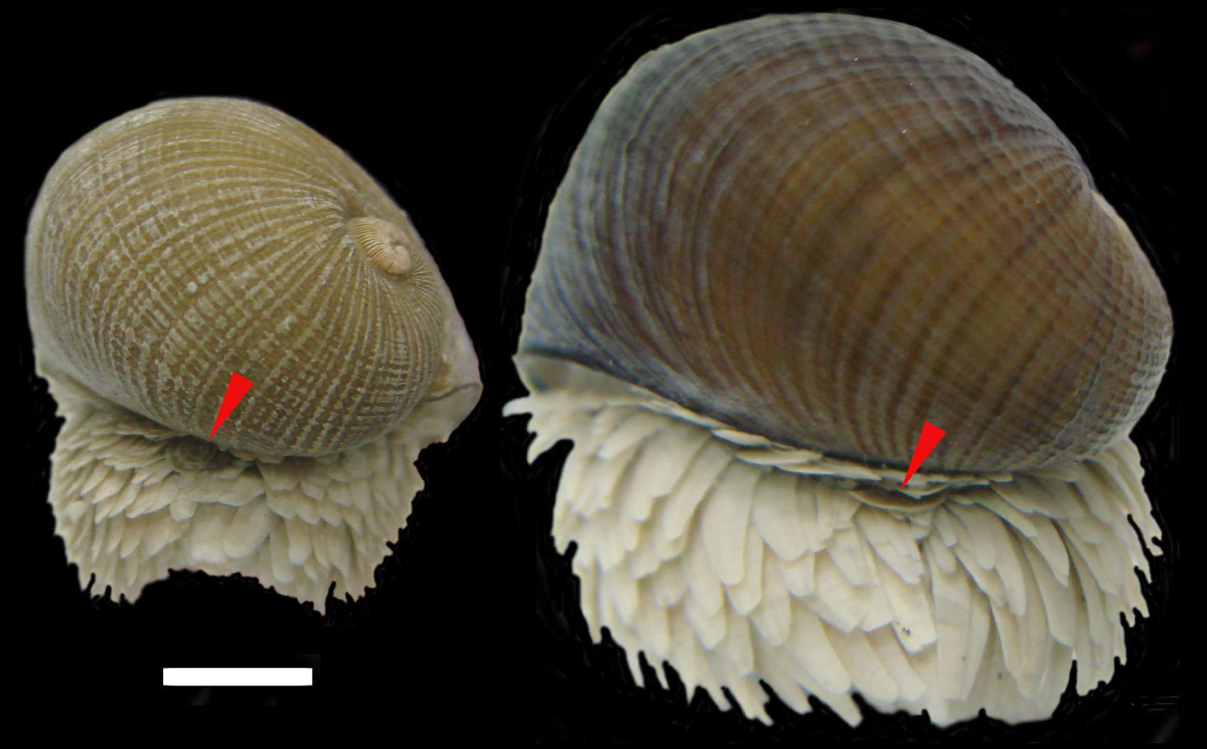
Adult snails with operculum indicated by red arrowheads. The scale bar is 5 mm.

=== External anatomy ===
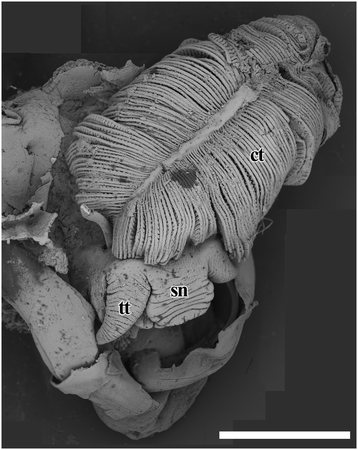
SEM image of the head and very large ctenidium (ct). sn – snout, tt – cephalic tentacle. The scale bar is 2 mm.

The scaly-foot gastropod has a thick snout, which tapers distally to a blunt end. The mouth is a circular ring of muscles when contracted and closed. The two smooth cephalic tentacles are thick at the base and gradually taper to a fine point at their distal tips. This snail has no eyes. There is no specialised copulatory appendage. The foot is red and large, and the snail cannot withdraw the foot entirely into the shell. There is no pedal gland in the front part of the foot. There are also no epipodial tentacles.

=== Internal anatomy ===
In C. squamiferum, the soft parts of the animal occupy approximately two whorls of the interior of the shell. The shell muscle is horseshoe-shaped and large, divided in two parts on the left and right, and connected by a narrower attachment. The mantle edge is thick but simple without any distinctive features. The mantle cavity is deep and reaches the posterior edge of the shell. The medial to left side of the cavity is dominated by a very large bipectinate ctenidium. Ventral to the visceral mass, the body cavity is occupied by a huge esophageal gland, which extends to fill the ventral floor of the mantle cavity.

The digestive system is simple, and is reduced to less than 10% of the volume typical in gastropods. The radula is "weak", of the rhipidoglossan type, with a single pair of radular cartilages. The formula of the radula is ~50 + 4 + 1 + 4 + ~50. The radula ribbon is 4 mm long, 0.5 mm wide; the width to length ratio is approximately 1:10. There is no jaw, and no salivary glands. A part of the anterior oesophagus rapidly expands into a huge, hypertrophied, blind-ended esophageal gland, which occupies much of the ventral face of the mantle cavity (estimated 9.3% body volume). The esophageal gland grows isometrically with the snail, consistent with the snail depending on its endosymbiont microbes throughout its settled life. The oesophageal gland has a uniform texture, and is highly vascularised with fine blood vessels. The stomach has at least three ducts at its anterior right, connecting to the digestive gland. There are consolidated pellets in both the stomach and in the hindgut. These pellets are probably granules of sulfur produced by the endosymbiont as a way to detoxify hydrogen sulfide. The intestine is reduced, and only has a single loop. The extensive and unconsolidated digestive gland extends to the posterior, filling the shell apex of the shell. The rectum does not penetrate the heart, but passes ventral to it. The anus is located on the right side of the snail, above the genital opening.

In the excretory system, the nephridium is central, tending to the right side of the body, as a thin dark layer of glandular tissue. The nephridium is anterior and ventral of the digestive gland, and is in contact with the dorsal side of the foregut.

The respiratory system and circulatory system consist of a single left bipectinate ctenidium (gill), which is very large (15.5% of the body volume), and is supported by many large and mobile blood sinuses filled with haemocoel. On dissection, the blood sinuses and lumps of haemocoel material are a prominent feature throughout the body cavity. Although the circulatory system in Chrysomallon is mostly closed (meaning that haemocoel mostly does not leave blood sinuses), the prominent blood sinuses appear to be transient, and occur in different areas of the body in different individuals. There are thin gill filaments on either side of the ctenidium. The bipectinate ctenidium extends far behind the heart into the upper shell whorls; it is much larger than in Peltospira. Although this species has a similar shell shape and general form to other peltospirids, the ctenidium is proportional size to that of Hirtopelta, which has the largest gill among peltospirid genera that have been investigated anatomically so far.

The ctenidium provides oxygen for the snail, but the circulatory system is enlarged beyond the scope of other similar vent gastropods. There are no endosymbionts in or on the gill of C. squamiferum. The enlargement of the gill is probably to facilitate extracting oxygen in the low-oxygen conditions that are typical of hydrothermal-vent ecosystems.

At the posterior of the ctenidium is a remarkably large and well-developed heart. The heart is unusually large for any animal proportionally. Based on the volume of the single auricle and ventricle, the heart complex represents approximately 4% of the body volume (for example, the heart of humans is 1.3% of the body volume). The ventricle is 0.64 mm long in juveniles with a shell length of 2.2 mm, and grows to 8 mm long in adults. This proportionally giant heart primarily sucks blood through the ctenidium and supplies the highly vascularised oesophageal gland. In C. squamiferum the endosymbionts are housed in an esophageal gland, where they are isolated from the vent fluid. The host is thus likely to play a major role in supplying the endosymbionts with necessary chemicals, leading to increased respiratory needs. Detailed investigation of the haemocoel of C. squamiferum will reveal further information about its respiratory pigments.

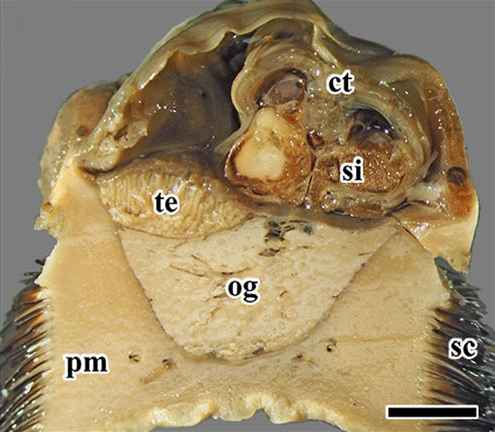
Cross section of a scaly-foot gastropod, showing highly enlarged oesophageal gland (og). ct – ctenidium, pm – pedal muscle, sc – scales, si – blood sinus, te – testis. The scale bar is 1 cm.

The scaly-foot gastropod is a chemosymbiotic holobiont. It hosts thioautotrophic (sulfur-oxidising) gammaproteobacterial endosymbionts in a much enlarged oesophageal gland, and appears to rely on these symbionts for nutrition. The closest known relative of this endosymbiont is that one from Alviniconcha snails. In this species, the size of the oesophageal gland is about two orders of magnitude larger than the usual size. There is a significant embranchment within the oesophageal gland, where the blood pressure likely decreases to almost zero. The elaborate cardiovascular system most likely evolved to oxygenate the endosymbionts in an oxygen-poor environment, and/or to supply hydrogen sulfide to the endosymbionts. Thioautotrophic gammaproteobacteria have a full set of genes required for aerobic respiration, and are probably capable of switching between the more efficient aerobic respiration, and the less efficient anaerobic respiration, depending on oxygen availability. In 2014, the endosymbiont of the scaly-foot gastropod become the first endosymbiont of any gastropod for which the complete genome was known. C. squamiferum was previously thought to be the only species of Peltospiridae that has an enlarged oesophageal gland, but later it was discovered that both species of Gigantopelta also have an enlarged oesophageal gland. Chrysomallon and Gigantopelta are the only vent animals, except siboglinid tubeworms, that house endosymbionts within an enclosed part of the body not in direct contact with vent fluid.

The nervous system is large, and the brain is a solid neural mass without ganglia. The nervous system is reduced in complexity and enlarged in size compared to other neomphaline taxa. As is typical of gastropods, the nervous system is composed of an anterior oesophageal nerve ring and two pairs of longitudinal nerve cords, the ventral pair innervating the foot and the dorsal pair forming a twist via streptoneury. The frontal part of the oesophageal nerve ring is large, connecting two lateral swellings. The huge fused neural mass is directly adjacent to, and passes through, the oeosophageal gland, where the bacteria are housed. There are large tentacular nerves projecting into the cephalic tentacles. The sensory organs of the scaly-foot gastropod include statocysts surrounded by the oesophageal gland, each statocyst with a single statolith. There are also sensory ctenidial bursicles on the tip of the gill filaments; these are known to be present in most vetigastropods, and are present in some neomphalines.

The reproductive system has some unusual features. The gonads of adult snails are not inside the shell; they are in the head-foot region on the right side of the body. There are no gonads present in juveniles with shell length of 2.2 mm. Adults possess both testis and ovary in different levels of development. The testis is placed ventrally; the ovary is placed dorsally, and the nephridium lies between them. There is a "spermatophore packaging organ" next to the testis. Gonoducts from the testis and ovary are initially separate, but apparently fuse to a single duct, and emerge as a single genital opening on the right of the mantle cavity. The animal has no copulatory organ.

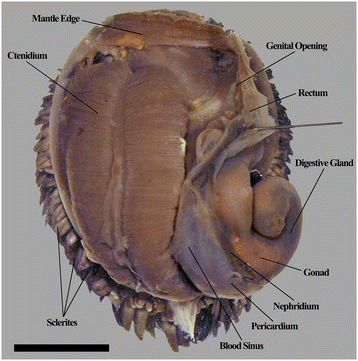
Dorsal view of C. squamiferum showing a mantle cavity overview. The shell and mantle tissue have been removed. Scale bar is 1 cm.

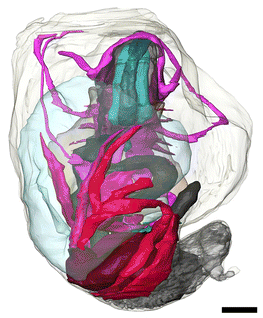
3D reconstruction shows large ctenidium and large heart, dorsal view. Scale bar is 250 μm.: grey/black – digestive tract; translucent blue – ctenidium; red – circulatory system; fuchsia – nervous system.; Soft body parts are shown as outlines in transparency.

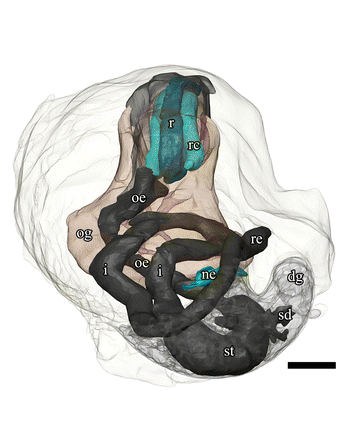
A 3D reconstruction of the digestive system shows the enlarged oesophageal gland, dorsal view. Scale bar is 250 μm.: grey/black – digestive tract; brown – oesophageal gland; green – nephridium; dark blue – radula; light blue – radular cartilage.

It is hypothesized that the derived strategy of housing endosymbiotic microbes in an oesophageal gland, has been the catalyst for anatomical innovations that serve primarily to improve the fitness of the bacteria, over and above the needs of the snail. The great enlargement of the oesophageal gland, the snail's protective dermal sclerites, its highly enlarged respiratory and circulatory systems and its high fecundity are all considered to be adaptations which are beneficial to its endosymbiont microbes. These adaptations appear to be a result of specialisation to resolve energetic needs in an extreme chemosynthetic environment.

== Ecology ==
=== Habitat ===
Scaly-foot gastropods at Solitaire hydrothermal field as recorded by Shinkai 6500

This species inhabits the hydrothermal vent fields of the Indian Ocean. It lives adjacent to both acidic and reducing vent fluid, on the walls of black-smoker chimneys, or directly on diffuse flow sites.

The depth of the Kairei field varies from 2,415 to 2,460 m (7,923 to 8,071 ft), and its dimensions are approximately 30 by 80 m (98 by 262 ft). The slope of the field is 10° to 30°. The substrate rock is troctolite and depleted mid-ocean ridge basalt. The Kairei-field scaly-foot gastropods live in the low-temperature diffuse fluids of a single chimney. The transitional zone, where these gastropods were found, is about 1–2 m (3–7 ft) in width, with temperature of 2–10 °C. The preferred water temperature for this species is about 5 °C. These snails live in an environment which has high concentrations of hydrogen sulfide, and low concentrations of oxygen.

The abundance of scaly-foot gastropods was lower in the Kairei field than in the Longqi field. The Kairei hydrothermal-vent community consists of 35 taxa, including sea anemones Marianactis sp., crustaceans Austinograea rodriguezensis, Rimicaris kairei, Mirocaris indica, Munidopsis sp., Neolepadidae genus and sp., Eochionelasmus sp., bivalves Bathymodiolus marisindicus, gastropods Lepetodrilus sp., Pseudorimula sp., Eulepetopsis sp., Shinkailepas sp., and Alviniconcha marisindica, Desbruyeresia marisindica, Bruceiella wareni, Phymorhynchus sp., Sutilizona sp., slit limpet sp. 1, slit limpet sp. 2, Iphinopsis boucheti, solenogastres Helicoradomenia? sp., annelids Amphisamytha sp., Archinome jasoni, Capitellidae sp. 1, Ophyotrocha sp., Hesionidae sp. 1, Hesionoidae sp. 2, Branchinotogluma sp., Branchipolynoe sp., Harmothoe? sp., Levensteiniella? sp., Prionospio sp., unidentified Nemertea and unidentified Platyhelminthes. Scaly-foot gastropods live in colonies with Alviniconcha marisindica snails, and there are colonies of Rimicaris kairei above them.

The Solitaire field is at a depth of 2,606 m (8,550 ft), and its dimensions are approximately 50 by 50 m (160 by 160 ft). The substrate rock is enriched mid-ocean ridge basalt. Scaly-foot gastropods live near the high-temperature diffuse fluids of chimneys in the vent field. The abundance of scaly-foot gastropods was lower in the Solitaire field than in the Longqi field. The Solitaire hydrothermal-vent community comprises 22 taxa, including: sea anemones Marianactis sp., crustaceans Austinograea rodriguezensis, Rimicaris kairei, Mirocaris indica, Munidopsis sp., Neolepadidae gen et sp., Eochionelasmus sp., bivalves Bathymodiolus marisindicus, gastropods Lepetodrilus sp., Eulepetopsis sp., Shinkailepas sp., Alviniconcha sp. type 3, Desbruyeresia sp., Phymorhynchus sp., annelids Alvinellidae genus and sp., Archinome jasoni, Branchinotogluma sp., echinoderm holothurians Apodacea gen et sp., fish Macrouridae genus and sp., unidentified Nemertea, and unidentified Platyhelminthes.

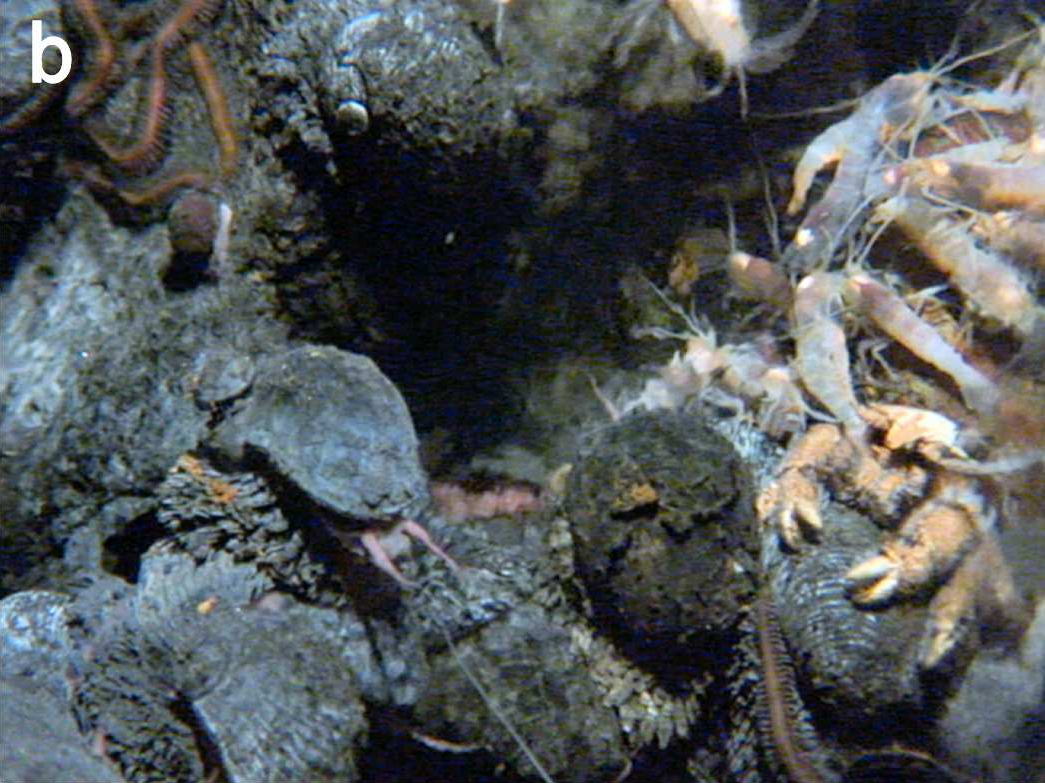
Faunal assemblage of scaly-foot gastropods with annelids and with crustaceans at Longqi vent field

The Longqi vent field is in a depth of 2,780 m (9,120 ft), and its dimensions are approximately 100 by 150 m (330 by 490 ft). C. squamiferum was densely populated in the areas immediately surrounding the diffuse-flow venting. The Longqi hydrothermal-vent community include 23 (Note: 21 species were known from Longqi as of 2016 and two new gastropods were described in 2017.) macro- and megafauna taxa: sea anemones Actinostolidae sp., annelids Polynoidae n. gen. n. sp. "655", Branchipolynoe n. sp. "Dragon", Peinaleopolynoe n. sp. "Dragon", Hesiolyra cf. bergi, Hesionidae sp. indet., Ophryotrocha n. sp. "F-038/1b", Prionospio cf. unilamellata, Ampharetidae sp. indet., mussels Bathymodiolus marisindicus, gastropods Gigantopelta aegis, Dracogyra subfuscus, Lirapex politus, Phymorhynchus n. sp. "SWIR", Lepetodrilus n. sp. "SWIR", crustaceans Neolepas sp. 1, Rimicaris kairei, Mirocaris indica, Chorocaris sp., Kiwa n. sp. "SWIR"17, Munidopsis sp. and echinoderm holothurians Chiridota sp. The density of Lepetodrilus n. sp. "SWIR" and scaly-foot gastropods is over 100 snails per m^{2} in close distance from vent fluid sources at Longqi vent field.

=== Feeding habits ===
The scaly-foot gastropod is an obligate symbiotroph throughout post-settlement life. Throughout its post-larval life, the scaly-foot gastropod obtains all of its nutrition from the chemoautotrophy of its endosymbiotic bacteria. The scaly-foot gastropod is neither a filter-feeder nor uses other mechanisms for feeding. The radula and radula cartilage are small, respectively constituting only 0.4% and 0.8% of juveniles' body volume, compared to 1.4% and 2.6% in the mixotrophic juveniles of Gigantopelta chessoia.

For identification of trophic interactions in a habitat, where direct observation of feeding habits is complicated, carbon and nitrogen stable-isotope compositions can be measured. There are depleted values of δ^{13}C in the oesophageal gland (relative to photosynthetically derived organic carbon). Chemoautotrophic symbionts were presumed as a source of such carbon. Chemoautotrophic origin of the stable carbon isotope ^{13}C was confirmed experimentally.

Carbon and nitrogen stable-isotope compositions
Tissue	δ^{13}C	δ^{15}N
Oesophageal gland	−20.7 ± 0.9 ‰	3.3 ± 1.8 ‰
Gill	−18.3 ± 0.6 ‰, from −17.4 to −18.8 ‰	3.9 ± 0.6 ‰, from 3.1 to 4.2 ‰
Mantle	from −17.5 to −18.6 ‰	from 3.5 to 4.7 ‰
Foot	−18.2 ± 0.6 ‰	3.8 ± 0.5 ‰
Scales	−16.7 ± 0.6 ‰	3.8 ± 0.9 ‰

=== Life cycle ===
This species has a high fecundity and is the only simultaneous hermaphrodite in the family Peltospiridae as of 2015. It lays eggs that are probably of lecithotrophic type and negatively buoyant under atmospheric pressure. Neither the larvae nor the protoconch is known as of 2016, but it is thought that the species has a planktonic dispersal stage. The smallest C. squamiferum juvenile specimens ever collected had a shell length 2.2 mm. Statistical analyses revealed no genetic differentiation between the two populations in the Kairei and Solitaire fields, suggesting potential connectivity between the two vent fields. The Kairei population represents a potential source population for the two populations in the Central Indian Ridge. These snails are difficult to keep alive in an artificial environment; however, they survived in aquaria at atmospheric pressure for more than three weeks.

== Conservation measures and threats ==
The scaly-foot gastropod is not protected. Its potential habitat across all Indian Ocean hydrothermal vent fields has been estimated to be at most 0.27 square kilometres (67 acres), while the three known sites at which it has been found, between which only negligible migration occurs, add up to 0.0177 square kilometres (4.4 acres), or less than one-fifth of a football field.

The population at the Longqi vent field may be of particular concern. The Southwest Indian Ridge, within which it is located, is one of the slowest-spreading mid-ocean ridges, and the low rate of natural disturbances is associated with ecological communities that are likely more sensitive to and recover more slowly from disruptions. Slow-spreading centers may also create larger mineral deposits, making those sensitive areas primary targets for deep-sea mining. Furthermore, by genetic measures the population at Longqi is poorly connected to those at the Kairei and Solitaire vent fields, over 2000 km away within the Central Indian Ridge.

The Solitaire Vent Field falls within the exclusive economic zone of Mauritius, while the other two sites are within Areas Beyond National Jurisdiction (commonly known as the high seas) under the authority of the International Seabed Authority, which has granted commercial mining exploration licenses for both. The Kairei Vent Field is under a license to Germany (2015–2030), the Longqi Vent Field to China (2011–2026). As of 2017, no conservation measures are proposed or in place for any of the three sites.

It has been listed as an endangered species in the IUCN Red List of Threatened Species since July 4, 2019.

== See also ==
- Iron in biology
