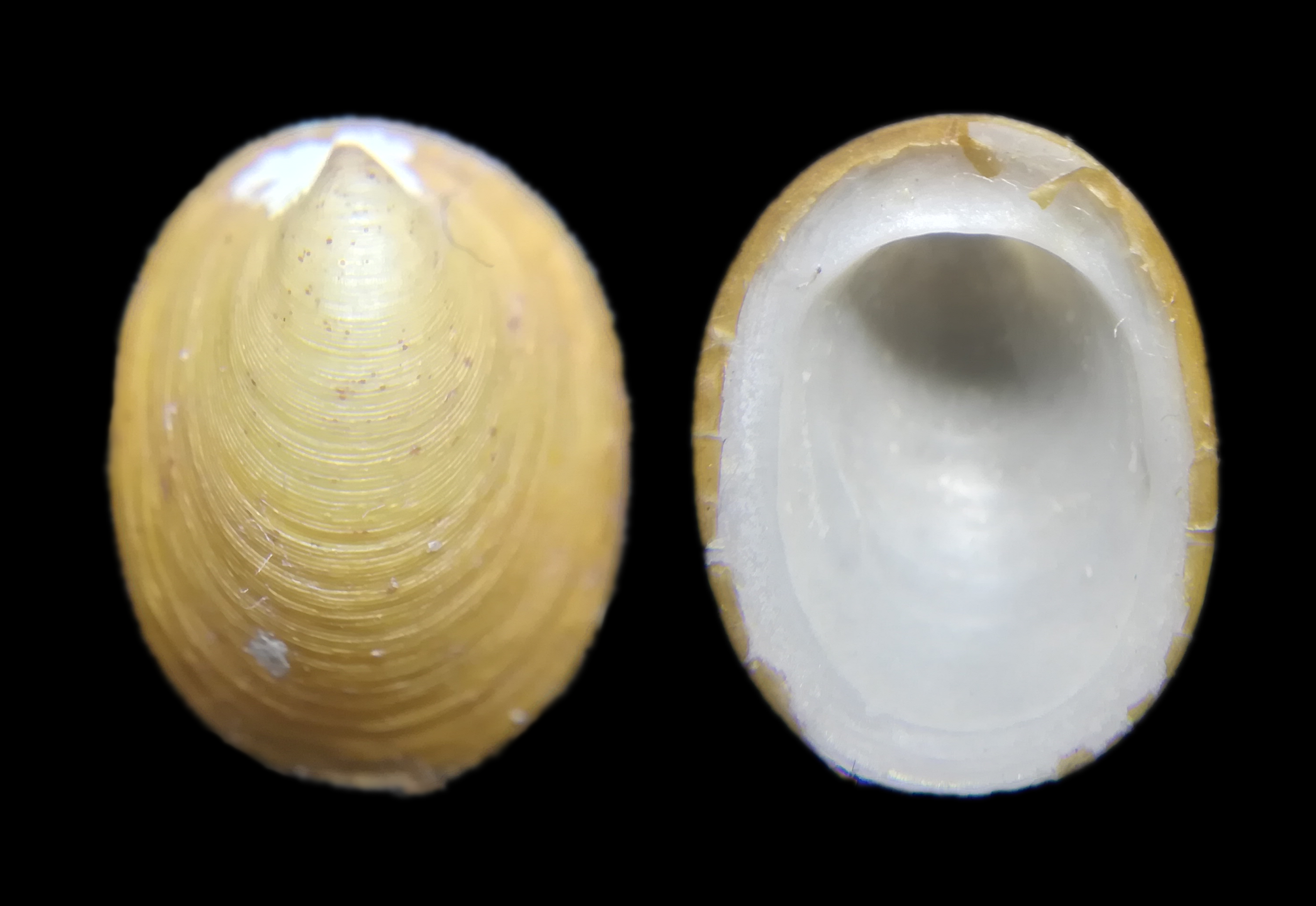

Scientific classification
- Kingdom: Animalia
- Phylum: Mollusca
- Class: Gastropoda
- Subclass: Vetigastropoda
- Order: Lepetellida
- Family: Lepetodrilidae
- Genus: Lepetodrilus
- Species: L. ovalis

Binomial name
- Lepetodrilus ovalis McLean, 1988

= Lepetodrilus ovalis =

Species of gastropod

Lepetodrilus ovalis is a species of small, deep-sea sea snail, a hydrothermal vent limpet, a marine gastropod mollusc in the family Lepetodrilidae.

== Distribution ==
This species occurs in hydrothermal vents and seeps off the East Pacific Rise.
