= Lepetodrilus elevatus =

Scientific classification
- Kingdom: Animalia
- Phylum: Mollusca
- Class: Gastropoda
- Subclass: Vetigastropoda
- Order: Lepetellida
- Family: Lepetodrilidae
- Genus: Lepetodrilus
- Species: L. elevatus

Binomial name
- Lepetodrilus elevatus McLean, 1988

Synonyms
- Lepetodrilus elevatus elevatus McLean, 1988

Species of gastropod

Lepetodrilus elevatus is a species of small, deep-sea sea snail, a hydrothermal vent limpet, a marine gastropod mollusc in the family Lepetodrilidae.

== Distribution ==
This species occurs in hydrothermal vents and seeps of the East Pacific Rise.
