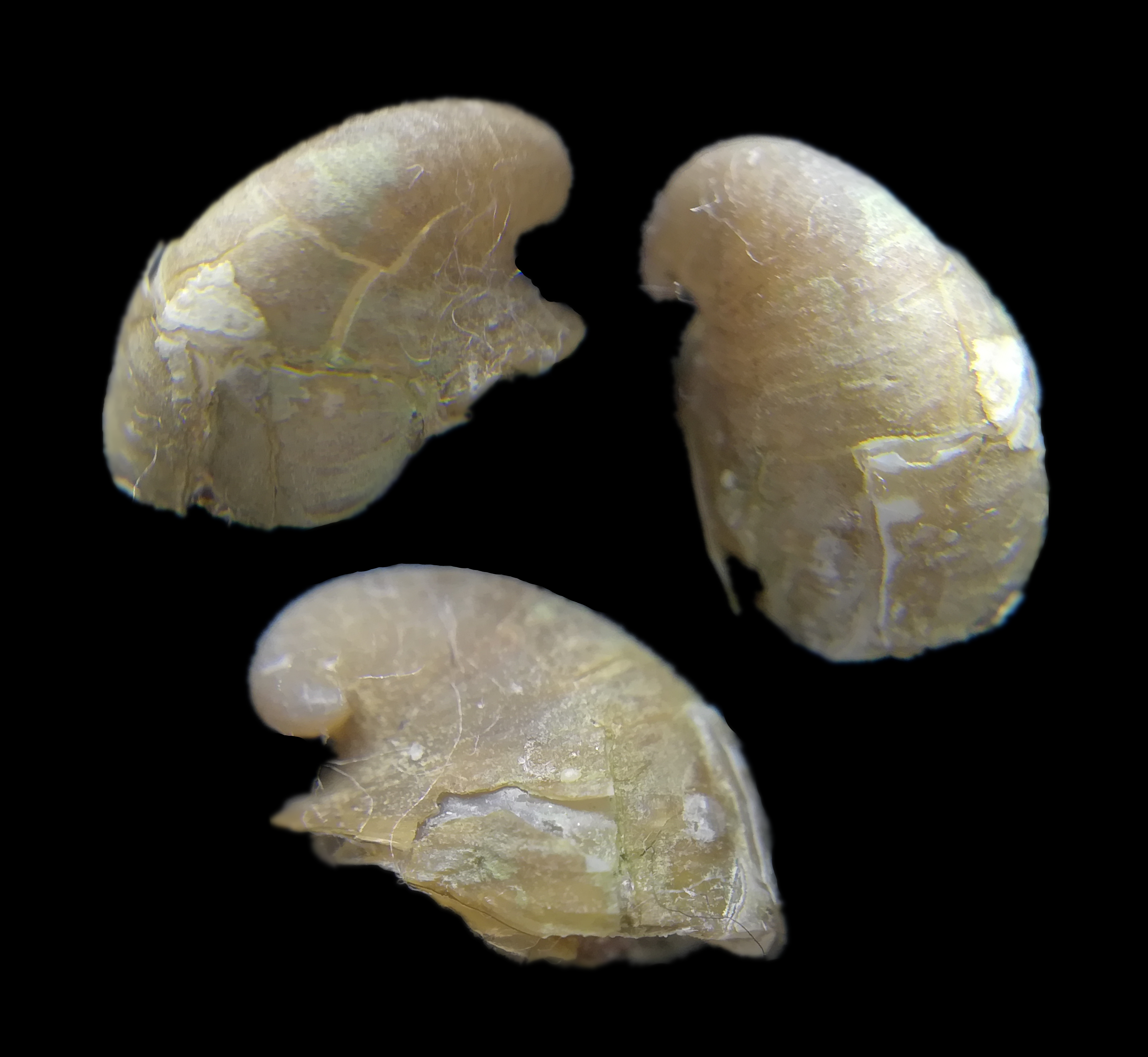

Scientific classification
- Kingdom: Animalia
- Phylum: Mollusca
- Class: Gastropoda
- Subclass: Vetigastropoda
- Order: Lepetellida
- Family: Lepetodrilidae
- Genus: Lepetodrilus
- Species: L. fucensis

Binomial name
- Lepetodrilus fucensis McLean, 1988

= Lepetodrilus fucensis =

Species of gastropod

Lepetodrilus fucensis is a species of small, deep-sea sea snail, a hydrothermal vent limpet, a marine gastropod mollusc in the family Lepetodrilidae.

== Description ==
This species grows to an average size of 10 mm and individual reaching a size of 23mm was ever recorded (the holotype one). The shell is extremely thin, outline of aperture oval, anterior broader than posterior, margin of aperture not in one plane. Periostracum light to dark greenish-brown, tightly adhering, enveloping shell edge. Shell interior lacking thickened transverse ridge at posterior.

== Distribution ==
This species has a relatively extended distribution from the Explorer Ridge off Vancouver Island, British Columbia, and along the Juan de Fuca Ridge off Washington to central Oregon. They occur near hydrothermal vents and seeps.

== Etymology ==
The name is based on the general locality, Juan de Fuca.
