= Gorgoleptis emarginatus =

Scientific classification
- Kingdom: Animalia
- Phylum: Mollusca
- Class: Gastropoda
- Subclass: Vetigastropoda
- Order: Lepetellida
- Family: Lepetodrilidae
- Genus: Gorgoleptis
- Species: G. emarginatus

Binomial name
- Gorgoleptis emarginatus McLean, 1988

Species of gastropod

Gorgoleptis emarginatus is a species of sea snail, a marine gastropod mollusc in the family Lepetodrilidae.
