= Lepetodrilus pustulosus =

Scientific classification
- Kingdom: Animalia
- Phylum: Mollusca
- Class: Gastropoda
- Subclass: Vetigastropoda
- Order: Lepetellida
- Family: Lepetodrilidae
- Genus: Lepetodrilus
- Species: L. pustulosus

Binomial name
- Lepetodrilus pustulosus McLean, 1988

Species of gastropod

Lepetodrilus pustulosus is a species of small, deep-sea sea snail, a hydrothermal vent limpet, a marine gastropod mollusc in the family Lepetodrilidae.

== Description ==
The size of the shell reaches 6 mm.

== Distribution ==
This species occurs in hydrothermal vents and seeps off the East Pacific Rise and the Galapagos Rift
