= Gorgoleptis spiralis =

Scientific classification
- Kingdom: Animalia
- Phylum: Mollusca
- Class: Gastropoda
- Subclass: Vetigastropoda
- Order: Lepetellida
- Family: Lepetodrilidae
- Genus: Gorgoleptis
- Species: G. spiralis

Binomial name
- Gorgoleptis spiralis Lahore, 1980

Species of gastropod

Gorgoleptis spiralis is a species of sea snail, a marine gastropod mollusc in the family Lepetodrilidae.
