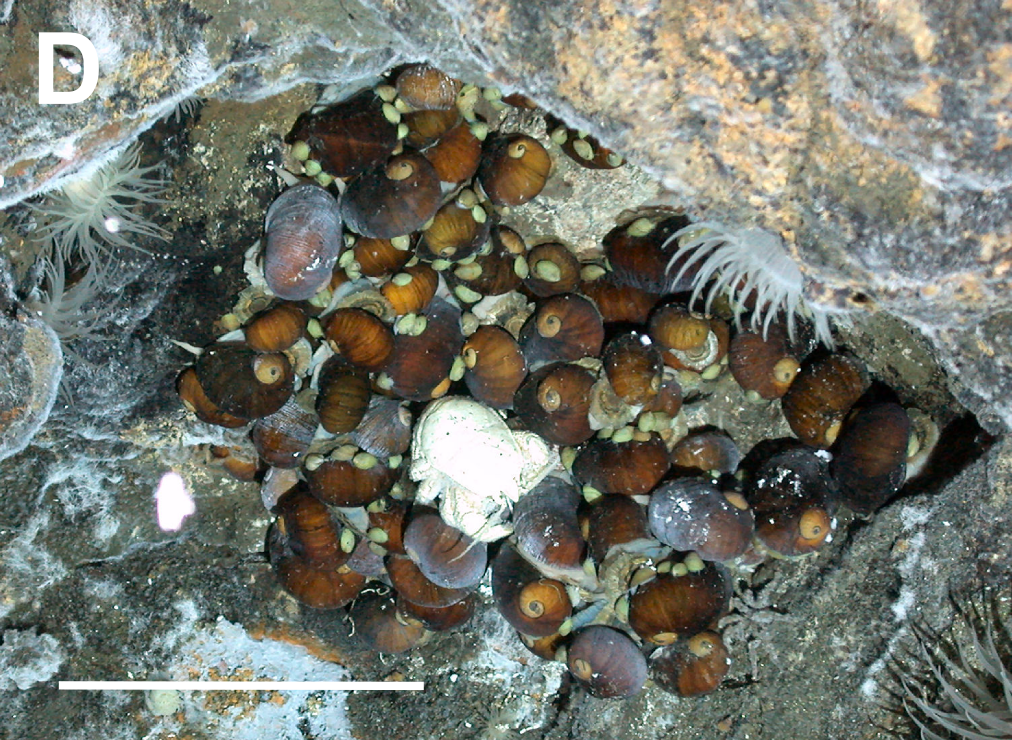
- Numerous individuals of the hydrothermal vent limpet Lepetodrilus sp. partially cover the shells of Gigantopelta chessoia on the East Scotia Ridge site E2 in the Scotia Sea

Scientific classification
- Kingdom: Animalia
- Phylum: Mollusca
- Class: Gastropoda
- Subclass: Vetigastropoda
- Order: Lepetellida
- Superfamily: Lepetodriloidea; McLean, 1988

Families
- See text

= Lepetodriloidea =

Superfamily of gastropods

Lepetodriloidea is a superfamily of small to large sea snails, hydrothermal vent limpets, marine gastropod molluscs in the clade Vetigastropoda.

== Families ==
Families within the superfamily Lepetodriloidea include:

- Family Lepetodrilidae McLean, 1988
- Family Sutilizonidae McLean, 1989

Families brought into synonymy

- Clypeosectidae McLean, 1989: synonym of Lepetodrilidae
- Gorgoleptidae: synonym of Lepetodrilidae
