= Lepetodrilus gordensis =

Scientific classification
- Kingdom: Animalia
- Phylum: Mollusca
- Class: Gastropoda
- Subclass: Vetigastropoda
- Order: Lepetellida
- Family: Lepetodrilidae
- Genus: Lepetodrilus
- Species: L. gordensis

Binomial name
- Lepetodrilus gordensis Johnson, Young, Jones, Waren & Vrijenhoek, 2006

Species of gastropod

Lepetodrilus gordensis is a species of small, deep-sea sea snail, a hydrothermal vent limpet, a marine gastropod mollusc in the family Lepetodrilidae.
