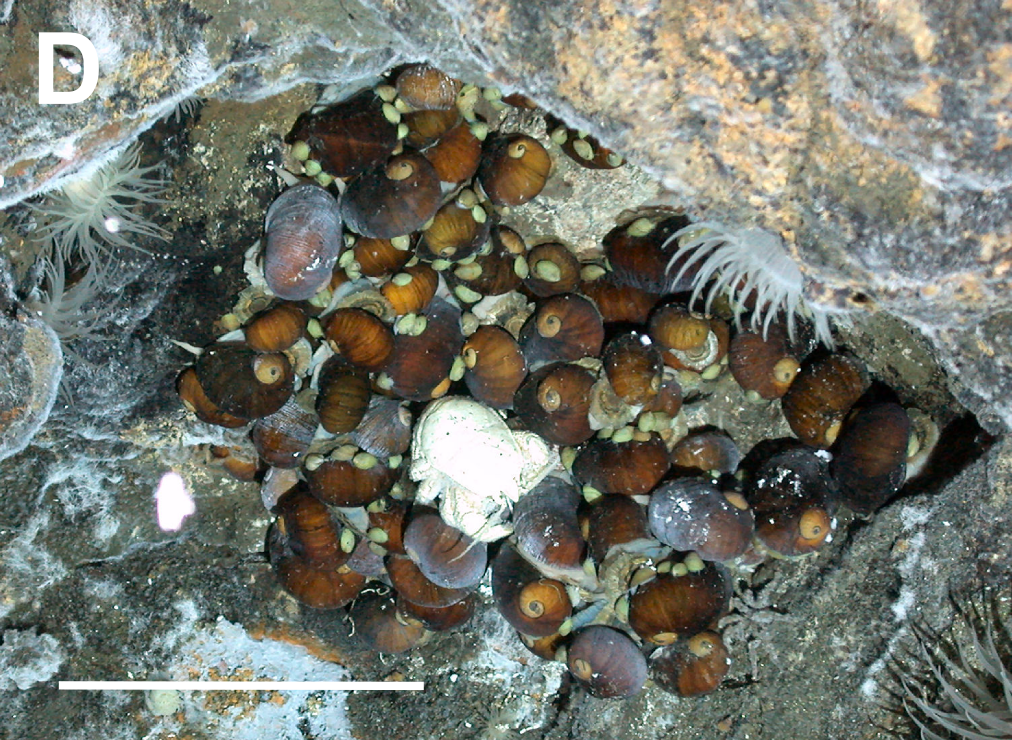
- Numerous individuals of the hydrothermal vent limpet Lepetodrilus sp. partially cover the shells of Gigantopelta chessoia on the East Scotia Ridge site E2 in the Scotia Sea, South Atlantic Ocean. Scale bar 10 cm.
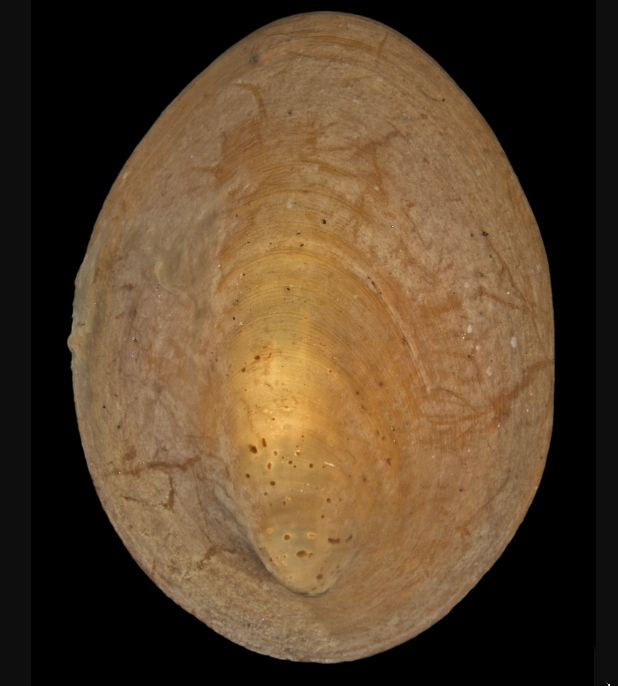
- Shell of Lepetodrilus fijiensis (holotype at MNHN, Paris)

Scientific classification
- Kingdom: Animalia
- Phylum: Mollusca
- Class: Gastropoda
- Subclass: Vetigastropoda
- Order: Lepetellida
- Family: Lepetodrilidae
- Genus: Lepetodrilus; McLean, 1988

Type species
- Lepetodrilus pustulosus McLean, 1988

Diversity
- At least 15 described species

= Lepetodrilus =

Genus of gastropods

Lepetodrilus is a genus of small, deep-sea sea snails, hydrothermal vent limpets, marine gastropod molluscs in the family Lepetodrilidae.

A few species have been found in methane and sulfide seeps.

== Species ==
Species within the genus Lepetodrilus include:

- Lepetodrilus atlanticus Warén & Bouchet, 2001
- Lepetodrilus concentricus Linse, Roterman & C. Chen, 2019
- Lepetodrilus corrugatus McLean, 1993
- Lepetodrilus cristatus McLean, 1988
- Lepetodrilus disco X.Y. Gu, C. Chen, Y.D. Zhou & J. Sun, 2026
- Lepetodrilus draco X.Y. Gu, C. Chen, Y.D. Zhou & J. Sun, 2026
- Lepetodrilus elevatus McLean, 1988
- Lepetodrilus fijiensis L. Beck, 2023
- Lepetodrilus fucensis McLean, 1988
- Lepetodrilus galriftensis McLean, 1988
- Lepetodrilus gordensis Johnson, Young, Jones, Waren & Vrijenhoek, 2006
- Lepetodrilus guaymasensis McLean, 1988
- Lepetodrilus japonicus Okutani, Fujikura & Sasaki, 1993
- Lepetodrilus marianae C. Chen, H. Watanabe & M. Tsuda, 2024
- Lepetodrilus nux Okutani, Fujikura & Sasaki, 1993
- Lepetodrilus ovalis McLean, 1988
- Lepetodrilus pustulosus McLean, 1988
- Lepetodrilus schrolli Beck, 1993
- Lepetodrilus shannonae Warén & Bouchet, 2009
- Lepetodrilus speratus X.Y. Gu, C. Chen, Y.D. Zhou & J. Sun, 2026
- Lepetodrilus tevnianus McLean, 1991
- Lepetodrilus timidus X.Y. Gu, C. Chen, Y.D. Zhou & J. Sun, 2026
- Lepetodrilus sp. East Scotia Ridge - from hydrothermal vents in the Scotia Sea

== Cladogram ==
This cladogram shows the phylogenic relationships within Lepetodrilus, based on sequences of cytochrome-c oxidase I (COI) genes based on Bayesian inference:

- Lepetodrilus
  - - - - - Lepetodrilus gordensis
          - Lepetodrilus fucensis
        - Lepetodrilus elevatus
      - Lepetodrilus tevnianus
    - Lepetodrilus cristatus
  - - - - - Lepetodrilus ovalis
          - Lepetodrilus pustulosus
        - - - Lepetodrilus atlanticus
            - Lepetodrilus sp. East Scotia Ridge
          - Lepetodrilus CIR1
      - Lepetodrilus CIR2
    - - Lepetodrilus nux
      - Lepetodrilus schrolli
