= Lepetodrilus shannonae =

Scientific classification
- Kingdom: Animalia
- Phylum: Mollusca
- Class: Gastropoda
- Subclass: Vetigastropoda
- Order: Lepetellida
- Family: Lepetodrilidae
- Genus: Lepetodrilus
- Species: L. shannonae

Binomial name
- Lepetodrilus shannonae Warén & Bouchet, 2009

Species of gastropod

Lepetodrilus shannonae is a species of small, deep-sea sea snail, a hydrothermal vent limpet, a marine gastropod mollusc in the family Lepetodrilidae.

== Distribution ==
This species occurs at methane seeps in deep water off the Congo River.
