= Lepetodrilus nux =

Scientific classification
- Kingdom: Animalia
- Phylum: Mollusca
- Class: Gastropoda
- Subclass: Vetigastropoda
- Order: Lepetellida
- Family: Lepetodrilidae
- Genus: Lepetodrilus
- Species: L. nux

Binomial name
- Lepetodrilus nux Okutani, Fujikura & Sasaki, 1993

Synonyms
- Rhynchopelta nux Okutani, Fujikura & Sasaki, 1993

Species of gastropod

Lepetodrilus nux is a species of small, deep-sea sea snail, a hydrothermal vent limpet, a marine gastropod mollusc in the family Lepetodrilidae.

== Distribution ==
This marine species occurs in hydrothermal vents and seeps off Japan.
