= Gorgoleptis =

Scientific classification
- Kingdom: Animalia
- Phylum: Mollusca
- Class: Gastropoda
- Subclass: Vetigastropoda
- Order: Lepetellida
- Family: Lepetodrilidae
- Genus: Gorgoleptis; McLean, 1988

Genus of gastropods

Gorgoleptis is a genus of sea snails, marine gastropod mollusks in the family Lepetodrilidae.

== Species ==
Species within the genus Gorgoleptis include:

- Gorgoleptis emarginatus McLean, 1988
- Gorgoleptis patulus McLean, 1988
- Gorgoleptis spiralis McLean, 1988
