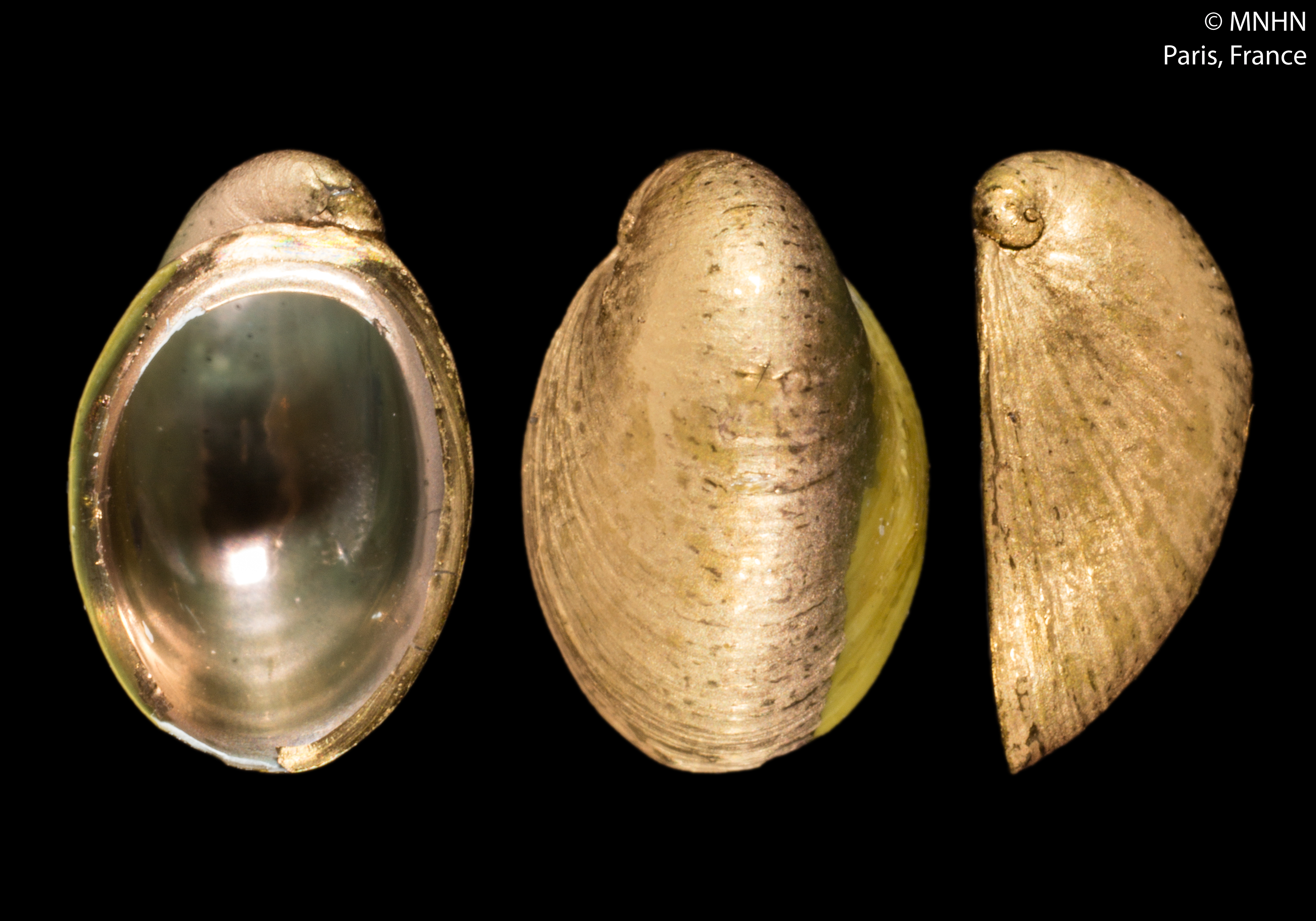
- Shell of Lepetrodrilus atlanticus (holotype at MNHN, Paris)

Scientific classification
- Kingdom: Animalia
- Phylum: Mollusca
- Class: Gastropoda
- Subclass: Vetigastropoda
- Order: Lepetellida
- Family: Lepetodrilidae
- Genus: Lepetodrilus
- Species: L. atlanticus

Binomial name
- Lepetodrilus atlanticus Warén & Bouchet, 2001

= Lepetodrilus atlanticus =

Species of gastropod

Lepetodrilus atlanticus is a species of small, deep-sea sea snail, a hydrothermal vent limpet, a marine gastropod mollusc in the family Lepetodrilidae.

== Distribution ==
This species occurs on hydrothermal vents and seeps of the Mid-Atlantic Ridge.

== Description ==
The size of the shell varies between 2.5 mm and 7.5 mm.

The maximum recorded shell length is 7.2 mm.

== Habitat ==
Minimum recorded depth is 840 m. Maximum recorded depth is 3520 m.
