= Drillia inornata =

Scientific classification
- Kingdom: Animalia
- Phylum: Mollusca
- Class: Gastropoda
- Subclass: Caenogastropoda
- Order: Neogastropoda
- Superfamily: Conoidea
- Family: Drilliidae
- Genus: Drillia
- Species: D. inornata

Binomial name
- Drillia inornata McLean & Poorman, 1971

Species of gastropod

Drillia inornata is a species of sea snail, a marine gastropod mollusk in the family Drilliidae.

== Description ==
The shell attains a length of 18 mm.

== Distribution ==
This species occurs in the demersal zone of the Pacific Ocean from the Gulf of California, Western Mexico, to Ecuador
