= Drillia cunninghamae =

Scientific classification
- Kingdom: Animalia
- Phylum: Mollusca
- Class: Gastropoda
- Subclass: Caenogastropoda
- Order: Neogastropoda
- Superfamily: Conoidea
- Family: Drilliidae
- Genus: Drillia
- Species: D. cunninghamae

Binomial name
- Drillia cunninghamae McLean & Poorman, 1971

Species of gastropod

Drillia cunninghamae is a species of sea snail, a marine gastropod mollusk in the family Drilliidae.

It was first described by J. H. McLean & R. Poorman in 1971.

== Description ==
The shell grows to a length of 35 mm (1.4 in). The species is a non-broadcast spawner and in its lifetime it doesn't have a trocophore larval stage.

== Distribution ==
This species is found in the demersal zone of the Eastern Pacific Ocean off Panama and the Gulf of California, found at depths between 10 and 63 m (33 and 207 ft).
