= Crassispira coracina =

Scientific classification
- Kingdom: Animalia
- Phylum: Mollusca
- Class: Gastropoda
- Subclass: Caenogastropoda
- Order: Neogastropoda
- Superfamily: Conoidea
- Family: Pseudomelatomidae
- Genus: Crassispira
- Species: C. coracina

Binomial name
- Crassispira coracina McLean & Poorman, 1971

Synonyms
- Crassispira (Striospira) coracina McLean & Poorman, 1971

Species of gastropod

Crassispira coracina is a species of sea snail, a marine gastropod mollusk in the family Pseudomelatomidae.

== Description ==
The length of the shell attains 13 mm.

== Distribution ==
This species occurs in the Pacific Ocean from Panama to Ecuador
