= Drillia valida =

Scientific classification
- Kingdom: Animalia
- Phylum: Mollusca
- Class: Gastropoda
- Subclass: Caenogastropoda
- Order: Neogastropoda
- Superfamily: Conoidea
- Family: Drilliidae
- Genus: Drillia
- Species: D. valida

Binomial name
- Drillia valida McLean & Poorman, 1971

Species of gastropod

Drillia valida is a species of sea snail, a marine gastropod mollusk in the family Drilliidae.

== Distribution ==
This species occurs in the demersal zone of the Pacific Ocean along Mexico to Panama.
