= Esophageal gland =

Glands in the digestive system

Esophageal glands
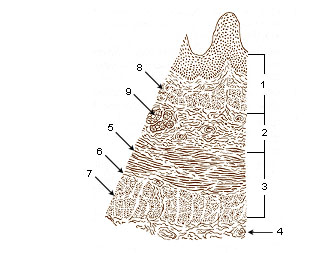
- Layers of Esophageal Wall: 1. Mucosa; 2. Submucosa; 3. Muscularis; 4. Adventitia; 5. Striated muscle 6. Striated and smooth 7. Smooth muscle 8. Lamina muscularis mucosae 9. Esophageal glands

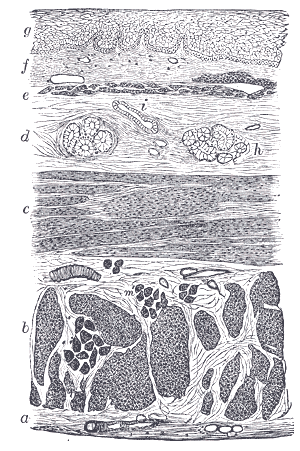
- Section of the human esophagus. Moderately magnified. The section is transverse and from near the middle of the gullet. a. Fibrous covering. b. Divided fibers of longitudinal muscular coat. c. Transverse muscular fibers. d. Submucous or areolar layer. e. Muscularis mucosae. f. Mucous membrane, with vessels and part of a lymphoid nodule. g. Stratified epithelial lining. h. Mucous gland. i. Gland duct. m’. Striated muscular fibers cut across.

Details

Identifiers
- Latin: glandulae oesophageae
- TA98: A05.4.01.017
- TA2: 2893
- FMA: 71619

The esophageal glands are glands that are part of the digestive system of various animals, including humans.

== In humans ==
In humans the glands are known as the esophageal submucosal glands and are a part of the human digestive system. They are a small compound racemose exocrine glands of the mucous type.

There are two types:

- Esophageal submucosal glands are compound tubulo-alveolar glands. Some serous cells are present. These glands are more numerous in the upper third of the esophagus. They secrete acid mucin for lubrication.
- Esophageal cardiac glands- mucous glands located near the cardiac orifice (esophago-gastric junction) in the lamina propria mucosae. They secrete neutral mucin that protects the esophagus from acidic gastric juices. They are simple tubular or branched tubular glands.
- There are also mucous glands present at the pharyngo-esophageal junction in the lamina propria mucosae. These are simple tubular or branched tubular glands.

Each opens upon the surface by a long excretory duct.

== In monoplacophorans ==
The esophageal gland is enlarged in large monoplacophoran species.

== In gastropods ==
The esophageal gland or oesophageal pouch is a part of the digestive system of some gastropods. The esophageal gland or pouch is a common feature in so-called basal gastropod clades, including Patelloidea, Vetigastropoda, Cocculiniformia, Neritimorpha and Neomphalina.

The size of the esophageal gland of the scaly-foot gastropod Chrysomallon squamiferum (family Peltospiridae within Neomphalina) is about two orders of magnitude over the usual size. The scaly-foot gastropod houses endosymbiotic bacteria in the esophageal gland. Chrysomallon squamiferum was thought to be the only species of Peltospiridae, that has an enlarged esophageal gland, but later it was shown that both species Gigantopelta the gland also enlarged. In other peltospirids, the posterior portion of the oesophagus forms a pair of blind mid-oesophageal pouches or gutters extending only to the anterior end of the foot (Rhynchopelta, Peltospira, Nodopelta, Echinopelta, Pachydermia). The same situation is in Melanodrymia within the family Melanodrymiidae. Bathyphytophilidae and Lepetellidae are also known to have enlarged esophageal pouches, however, though not to the extent of Chrysomallon. Both are known to house endosymbiotic bacteria, in the case of bathyphytophilids most likely also in the esophageal glands but in the lepetellids the endosymbionts are spread in the hemocoel.
