= Crassispira martiae =

Scientific classification
- Kingdom: Animalia
- Phylum: Mollusca
- Class: Gastropoda
- Subclass: Caenogastropoda
- Order: Neogastropoda
- Superfamily: Conoidea
- Family: Pseudomelatomidae
- Genus: Crassispira
- Species: C. martiae

Binomial name
- Crassispira martiae McLean & Poorman, 1971

Synonyms
- Crassispira (Dallspira) martiae McLean & Poorman, 1971; Dallspira martiae (McLean & Poorman, 1971)

Species of gastropod

Crassispira martiae is a species of sea snail, a marine gastropod mollusk in the family Pseudomelatomidae.

== Distribution ==
This species occurs off the Panama Canal Zone, Pacific Ocean, Panama.
