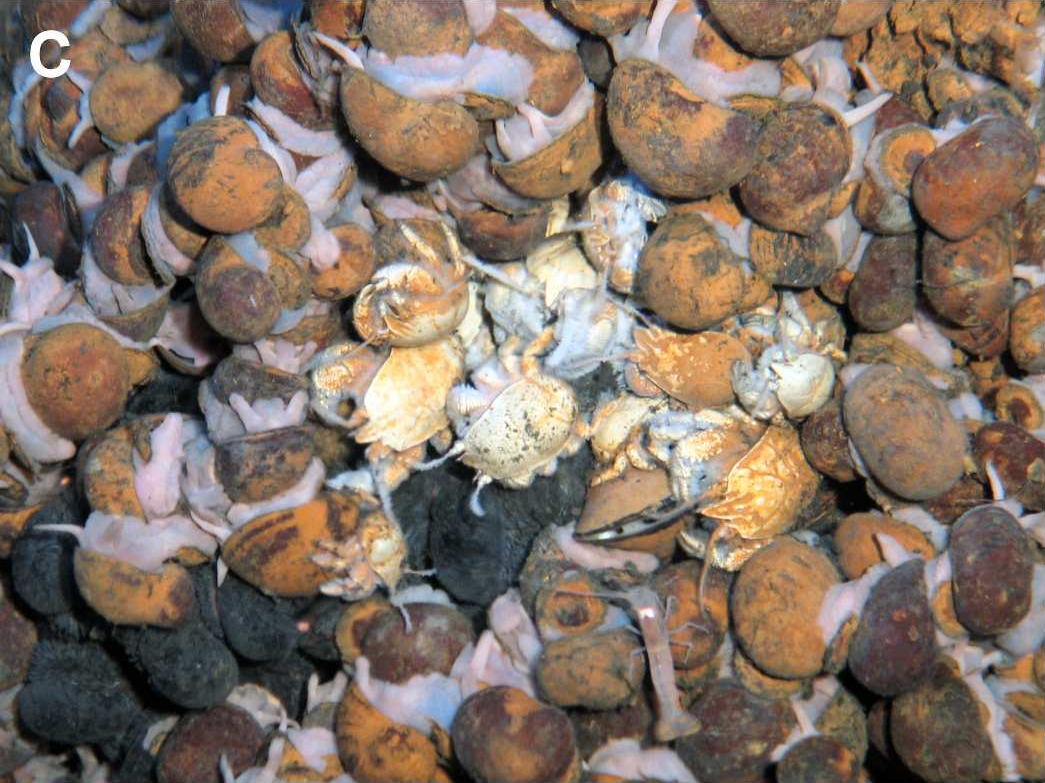
- Aggregation of Gigantopelta aegis with other animals, such as scaly-foot gastropods (black snails).

Scientific classification
- Kingdom: Animalia
- Phylum: Mollusca
- Class: Gastropoda
- Subclass: Vetigastropoda
- Family: Peltospiridae
- Genus: Gigantopelta
- Species: G. aegis

Binomial name
- Gigantopelta aegis Chen, Linse, Roterman, Copley & Rogers, 2015

= Gigantopelta aegis =

Species of gastropod

Gigantopelta aegis is a species of deep sea snail from hydrothermal vents, a marine gastropod mollusc in the family Peltospiridae.

== Taxonomy ==
It was described as a new species within new genus Gigantopelta in 2015 and it was classified within the family Peltospiridae.

== Distribution ==
This species is known from its type locality only: Longqi hydrothermal vent field in Southwest Indian Ridge, 37°47.03′S 49°38.96′E.

== Description ==
The width of the shell is 4.84–44.83 mm. Valeues of δ^{13}C were −26.42‰ ± 0.67. A distinguishing factor of the Gigantopelta aegis is their large size, hence the name, which translates to "gigantic shield" in Latin. While other peltospirids reach shell diameter sizes of 15mm on average, the Gigantopelta aegis can grow up to 45.7 mm. The shell is also thickly coated with a layer of sulphide. However, this is typical of other vent-dwelling gastropods. Another distinguishing factor for the Gigantopelta species is that sexual dimorphism is not exhibited, as seen in other peltopsirids.
