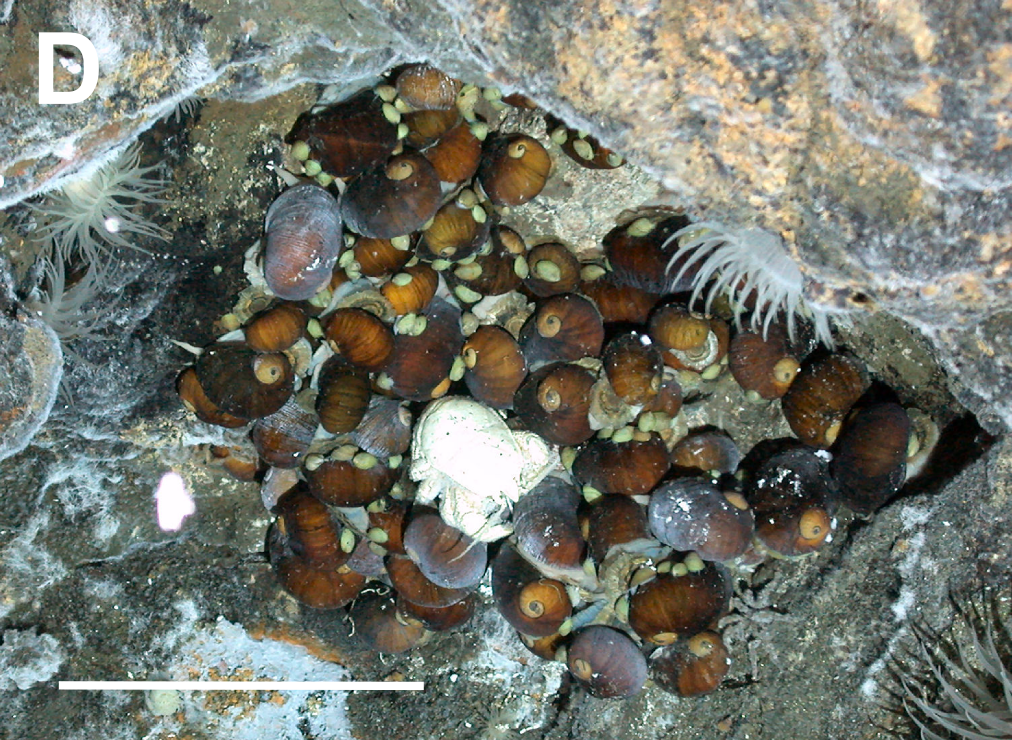
- View of a number of Gigantopelta chessoia (the brown snails) partially covered by limpets Lepetodrilus sp. (the small yellow-greenish oval shapes) at the East Scotia Ridge E2 hydrothermal vent site in the Scotia Sea. The scale bar is 10 cm.

Scientific classification
- Domain: Eukaryota
- Kingdom: Animalia
- Phylum: Mollusca
- Class: Gastropoda
- Subclass: Neomphaliones
- Order: Neomphalida
- Family: Peltospiridae
- Genus: Gigantopelta; Chen, Linse, Roterman, Copley & Rogers, 2015

Diversity
- 2 species

= Gigantopelta =

Genus of gastropods

Gigantopelta is a genus of deep sea snails from hydrothermal vents, marine gastropod mollusks in the family Peltospiridae.

== Species ==
- Gigantopelta aegis Chen, Linse, Roterman, Copley & Rogers, 2015
- Gigantopelta chessoia Chen, Linse, Roterman, Copley & Rogers, 2015
