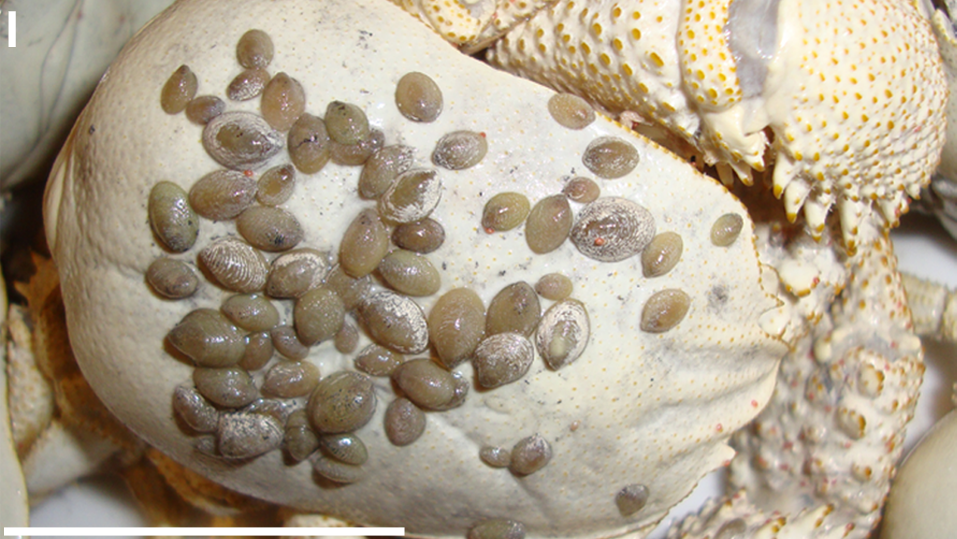
- Lepetodrilus sp. from East Scotia Ridge on carapace of large individual of Kiwa sp.

Scientific classification
- Kingdom: Animalia
- Phylum: Mollusca
- Class: Gastropoda
- Subclass: Vetigastropoda
- Order: Lepetellida
- Family: Lepetodrilidae
- Genus: Lepetodrilus
- Species: L. sp. East Scotia Ridge

Binomial name
- Lepetodrilus sp. East Scotia Ridge

= Lepetodrilus sp. East Scotia Ridge =

Species of gastropod

Lepetodrilus sp. East Scotia Ridge (nomen nudum) is an as yet undescribed species of small, deep-sea sea snail, a hydrothermal vent limpet, a marine gastropod mollusk in the family Lepetodrilidae.

The first information about this species, under the name "Lepetodrilus n. sp.", was published on 3 January 2012.

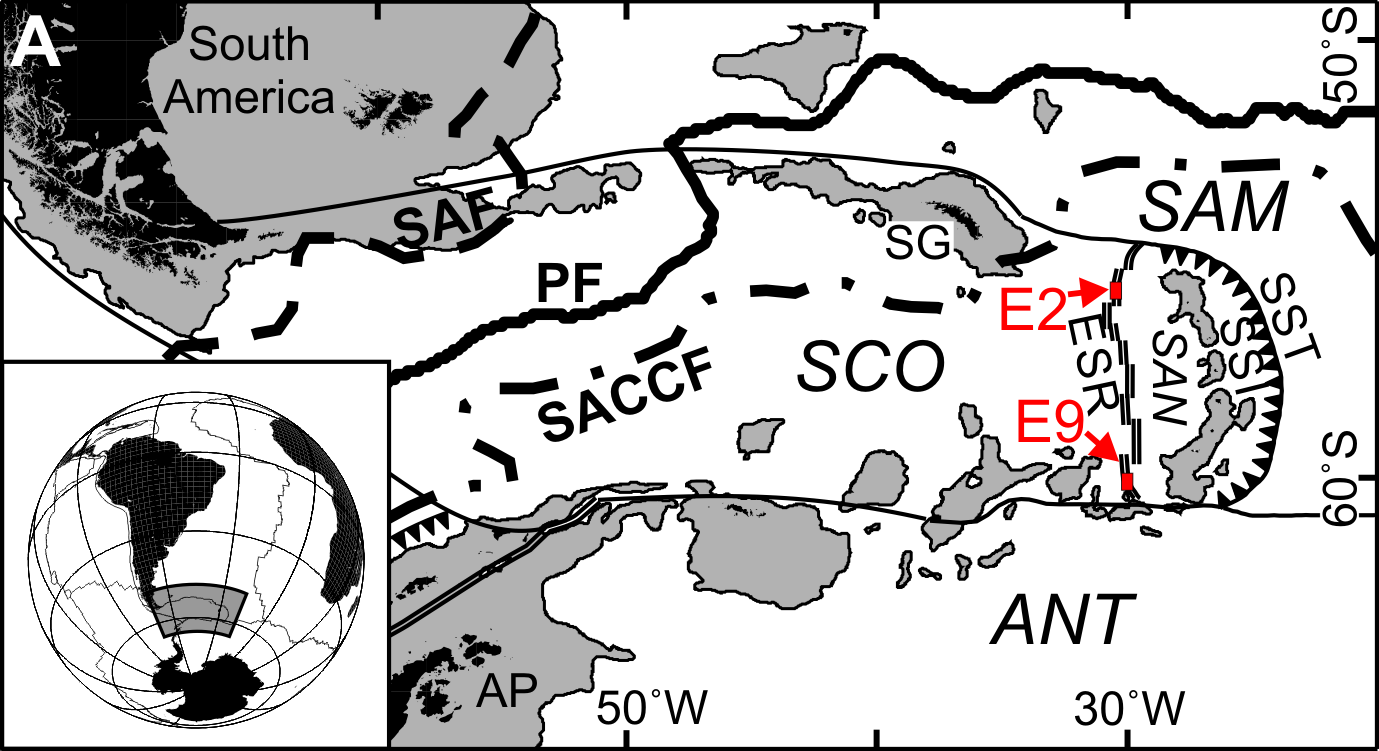
Location of E2 and E9 sites in the Scotia Sea showing the East Scotia Ridge (ESR) between the Scotia Plate (SCO) and South Sandwich Plate (SAN).

== Distribution ==
This species is known from two sites near hydrothermal vents in the East Scotia Ridge: from 2,394 m depth at the E9 vent site, and from 2,608 m depth at the E2 site.

== Description ==
Phylogenetic analysis of the mitochondrial cytochrome-c oxidase I (COI) gene of this limpet (GenBank accession number JN628254) and a range of other Lepetodrilus species, using Bayesian inference, places this species from East Scotia Ridge as a sister taxon to Lepetodrilus atlanticus, with a sequence divergence from this species of 5.48%. This level of genetic divergence is consistent with that found between Lepetodrilus species within complexes of sister taxa, where interspecific distances of between 3% and 15% have been observed.

== Ecology ==
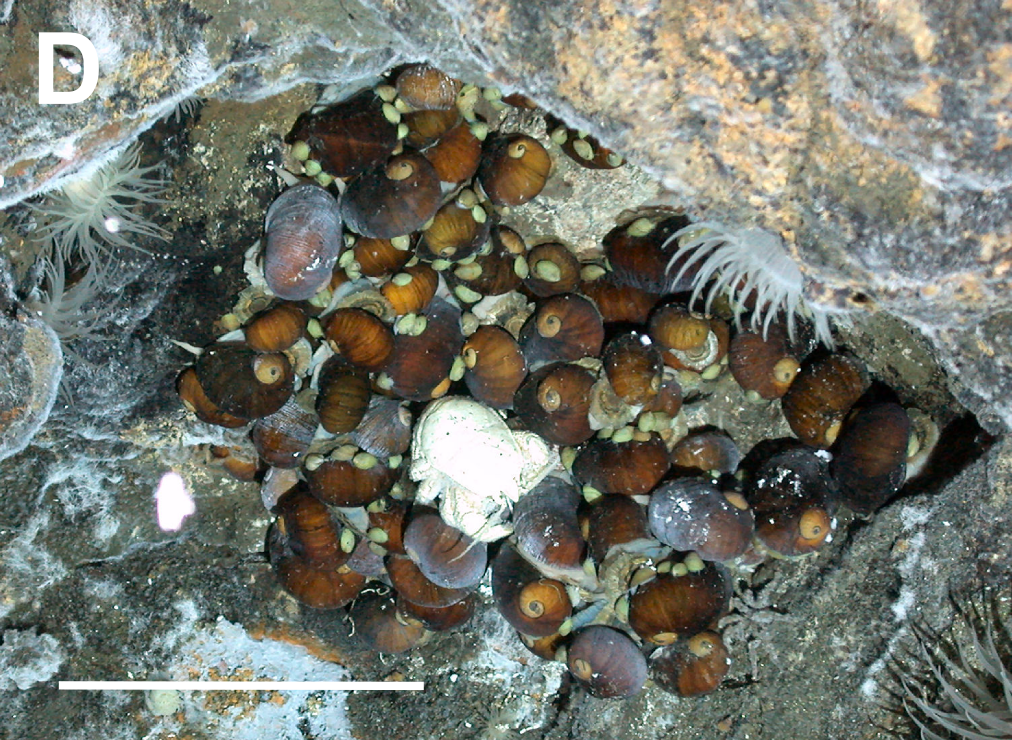
Numerous individuals of the hydrothermal vent limpet Lepetodrilus sp. East Scotia Ridge partially cover the shells of Gigantopelta chessoia on the East Scotia Ridge site E2 in the Scotia Sea, South Atlantic Ocean. Scale bar 10 cm.

This species is ubiquitous in low-temperature diffuse flow, being found on bare rock, sulphides, Kiwa sp., gastropods Gigantopelta chessoia, and stalked barnacles. On the carapace of Kiwa n. sp., a "halo" of pale colouration surrounding the limpets indicates where this species of Lepetodrilus is grazing epizoic microbes.

The population density of Lepetodrilus sp. on the barnacles Vulcanolepas scotiaensis was estimated to 20,172–56,904 individuals m^{−2}.
