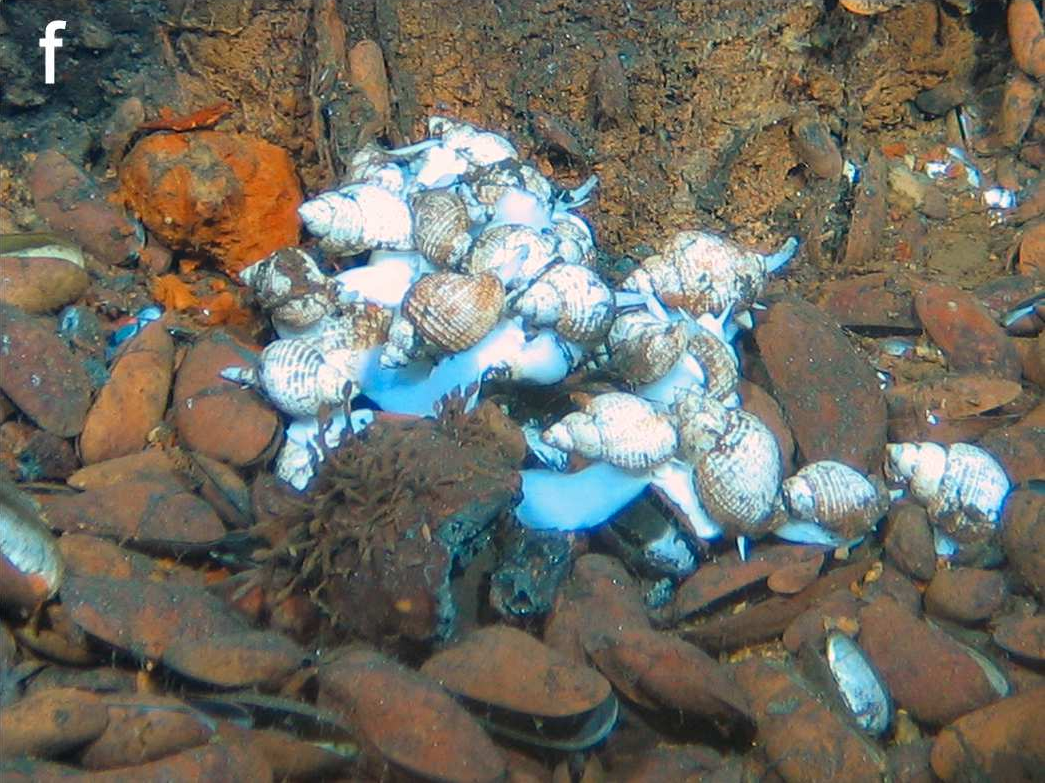
- Dead Bathymodiolus marisindicus mussel shells and live gastropods Phymorhynchus n. sp. "SWIR" at the base of an active vent chimney at Longqi vent field.

Conservation status
- Vulnerable (IUCN 3.1)

Scientific classification
- Kingdom: Animalia
- Phylum: Mollusca
- Class: Bivalvia
- Order: Mytilida
- Family: Modiolidae
- Genus: Bathymodiolus
- Species: B. marisindicus

Binomial name
- Bathymodiolus marisindicus Hashimoto, 2001

= Bathymodiolus marisindicus =

Species of bivalve

Bathymodiolus marisindicus is a species of deepwater hydrothermal vent mussel, a marine bivalve mollusk species in the family Mytilidae, the mussels. This species is found in the Indian Ocean.

== Description ==
In this species of Bathymodiolus, the inner mantle fusion is lacking, and there is a very short valvular siphonal membrane. The species can be distinguished from other species in the same genus by the length of the foot, the height to length ratio and thickness of the shell and the fact that the umbones are not at the very tip of the shell. Other distinguishing features are the length and strength of the ligament, and the unique positions of the anterior retractor muscle scar and the anterior bundle scar of the posterior byssal retractor muscle, on the inside of the shell surface.

== Taxonomy ==
While originally listed as a distinct species, recent genetic studies reveal that B. marisindicus should be recognized as a junior synonym to B. septemdierum, along with B. brevior. The other species were merged into B. septemdierum, because, since it was named first, it is given taxonomical priority over the others, according to the International Code of Zoological Nomenclature.
