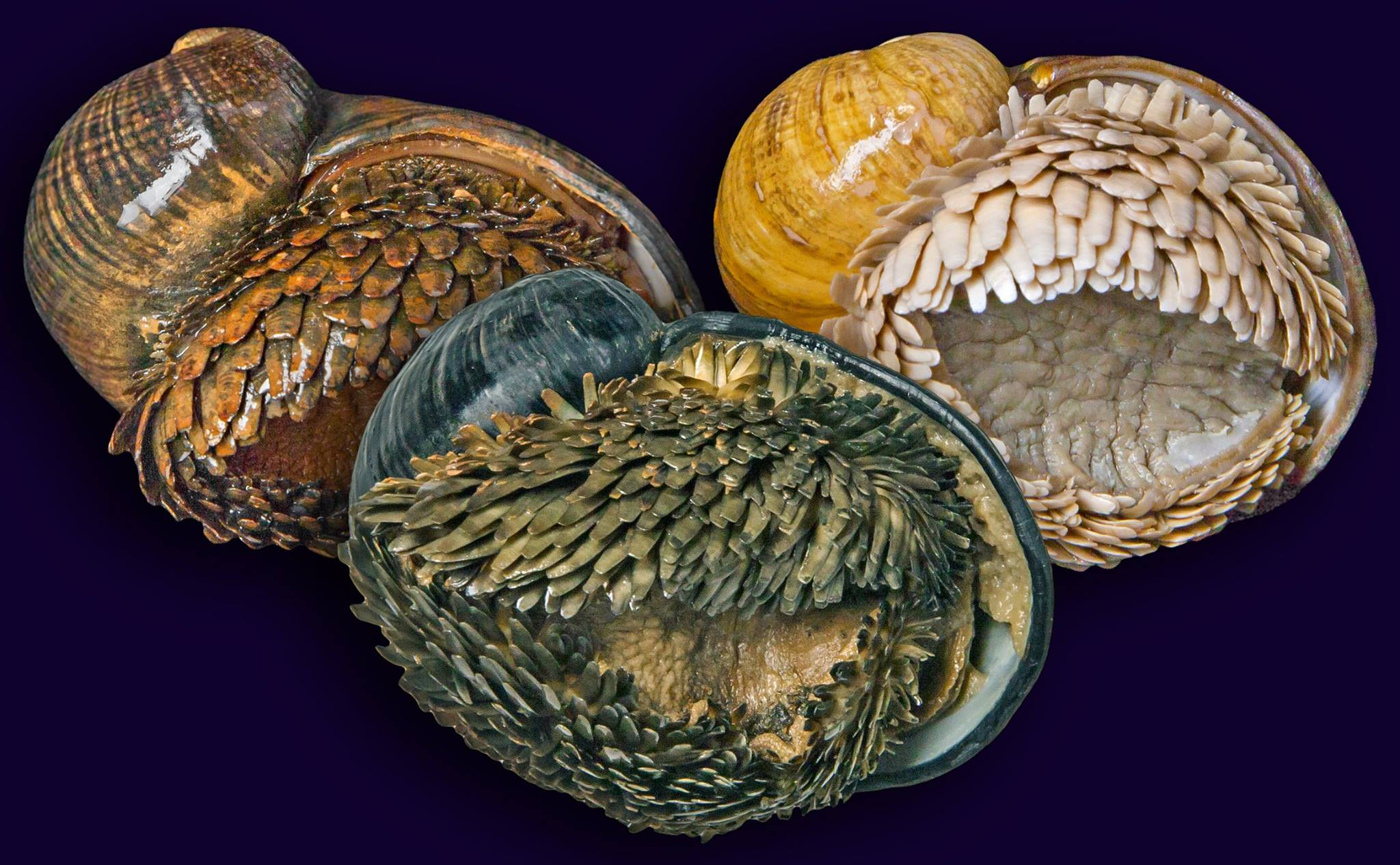
- Chrysomallon squamiferum

Scientific classification
- Kingdom: Animalia
- Phylum: Mollusca
- Class: Gastropoda
- Subclass: Vetigastropoda
- Superfamily: Neomphaloidea; McLean, 1981

Families
- Melanodrymiidae; Neomphalidae; Peltospiridae

Diversity
- 48 extant species

= Neomphaloidea =

Superfamily of gastropods

Neomphaloidea is a superfamily of deep-sea snails or limpets, marine gastropod mollusks. Neomphaloidea is the only superfamily in the order Neomphalida.

The order Neomphalida has the largest in situ radiation in hydrothermal vent habitats. Neomphalida is a major taxonomic grouping of sea snails, vent-endemic marine gastropod mollusks that form a very ancient lineage, going back to the Palaeozoic era.

== 2005 taxonomy ==
The superfamily Neomphaloidea was regarded for a long time as belonging within the clade Vetigastropoda. Superfamily Neomphaloidea was also classified in the clade Vetigastropoda according to the taxonomy of the Gastropoda by Bouchet & Rocroi, 2005.

== 2010 taxonomy ==
Molecular phylogeny showed that Neomphaloidea belongs in its own order, the Neomphalida, and that this clade is basal to the Vetigastropoda. The Neomphalina is, based on optimal phylogenetic analysis, a monophyletic clade, with uncertain relations among the gastropods.

== Description ==
The anatomical characteristics of the Neomphaloidea largely follow the patterns in the Vetigastropoda. However, unusual morphological and phylogentic characters suggest a different systematic position and place it in its own order, the Neomphalida. The formal placement of Neomphalida within the Gastropoda however remains ambiguous.

== Families ==
Families within the Neomphaloidea include:

- Melanodrymiidae Salvini-Plawen & Steiner, 1995
- Neomphalidae McLean, 1981
- Peltospiridae McLean, 1989

A few genera within Neomphaloidea have been unassigned to a family:

- Helicrenion Warén & Bouchet, 1993
- Retiskenea Warén & Bouchet, 2001

Synonyms

- Cyathermiidae J. H. McLean, 1990: synonym of Neomphalidae J. H. McLean, 1981

== See also ==
The other superfamily of hydrothermal vent limpets is the Lepetodriloidea.
