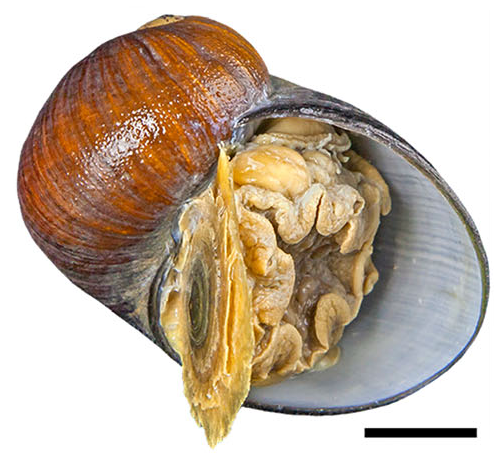
- Gigantopelta chessoia The scale bar is 1 cm.
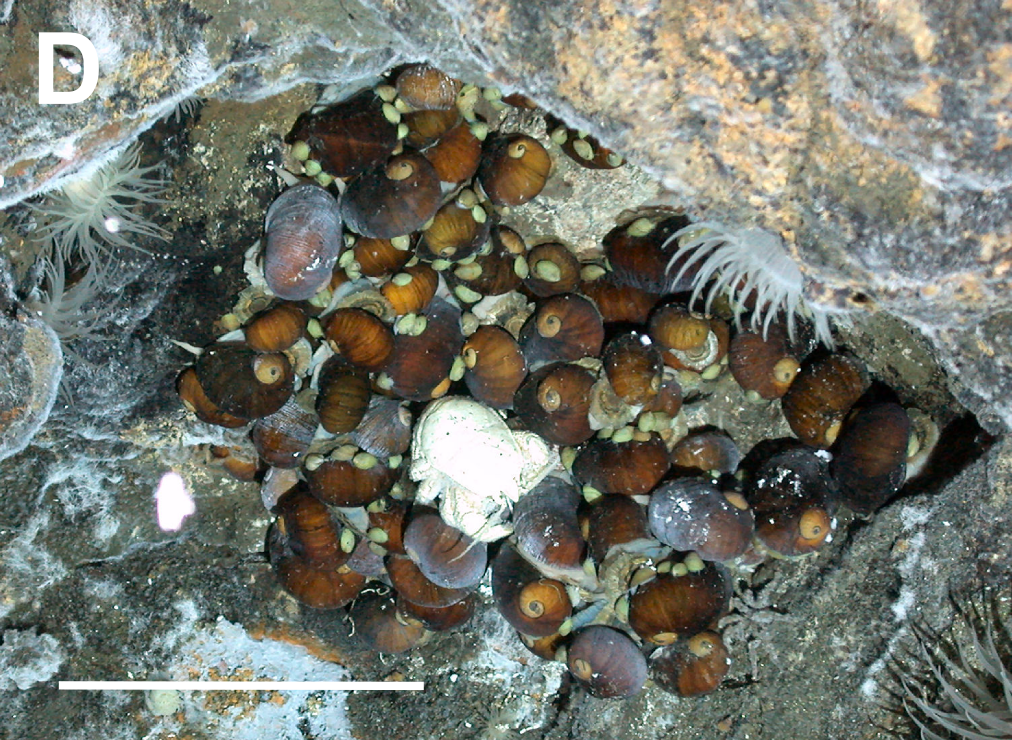
- View of a number of Gigantopelta chessoia (the brown snails) partially covered by limpets Lepetodrilus sp. (the small yellow-greenish oval shapes) at the East Scotia Ridge E2 hydrothermal vent site in the Scotia Sea. The scale bar is 10 cm.

Scientific classification
- Domain: Eukaryota
- Kingdom: Animalia
- Phylum: Mollusca
- Class: Gastropoda
- Subclass: Neomphaliones
- Order: Neomphalida
- Family: Peltospiridae
- Genus: Gigantopelta
- Species: G. chessoia

Binomial name
- Gigantopelta chessoia Chen, Linse, Roterman, Copley & Rogers, 2015

= Gigantopelta chessoia =

Species of gastropod

Gigantopelta chessoia is a species of deep sea snail from hydrothermal vents, a marine gastropod mollusk in the family Peltospiridae.

== Taxonomy ==
The first information about this species, under the name "Peltospiroidea n. sp." or "peltospiroid gastropod", was published on 3 January 2012. Peltospiroidea is the name of a superfamily of gastropods that was used in the taxonomy of the Gastropoda (Ponder & Lindberg, 1997). It contained only the extant family Peltospiridae and some prehistoric gastropod families. However, the taxonomy of the Gastropoda (Bouchet & Rocroi, 2005) does not use the name Peltospiroidea (in that system, Peltospiridae is placed within the superfamily Neomphaloidea).

It was described as a new species within the new genus Gigantopelta in 2015, in the family Peltospiridae.

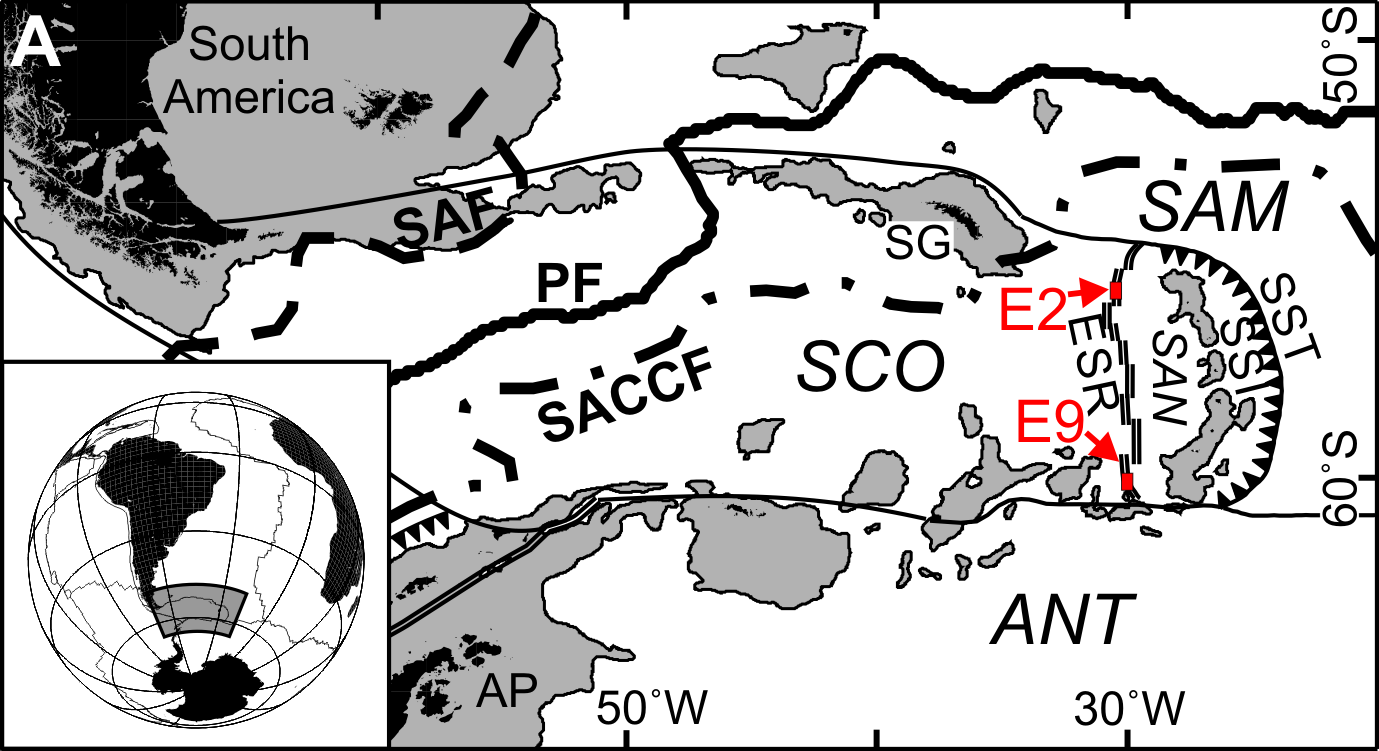
Location of E2 and E9 sites in the Scotia Sea showing the East Scotia Ridge (ESR) between the Scotia Plate (SCO) and South Sandwich Plate (SAN).

== Distribution ==
This species is known from two sites near hydrothermal vents in the East Scotia Ridge of the south Atlantic Ocean: from 2,394 m depth at the E9 vent site and from the 2,608 m depth at the E2 site.

== Description ==
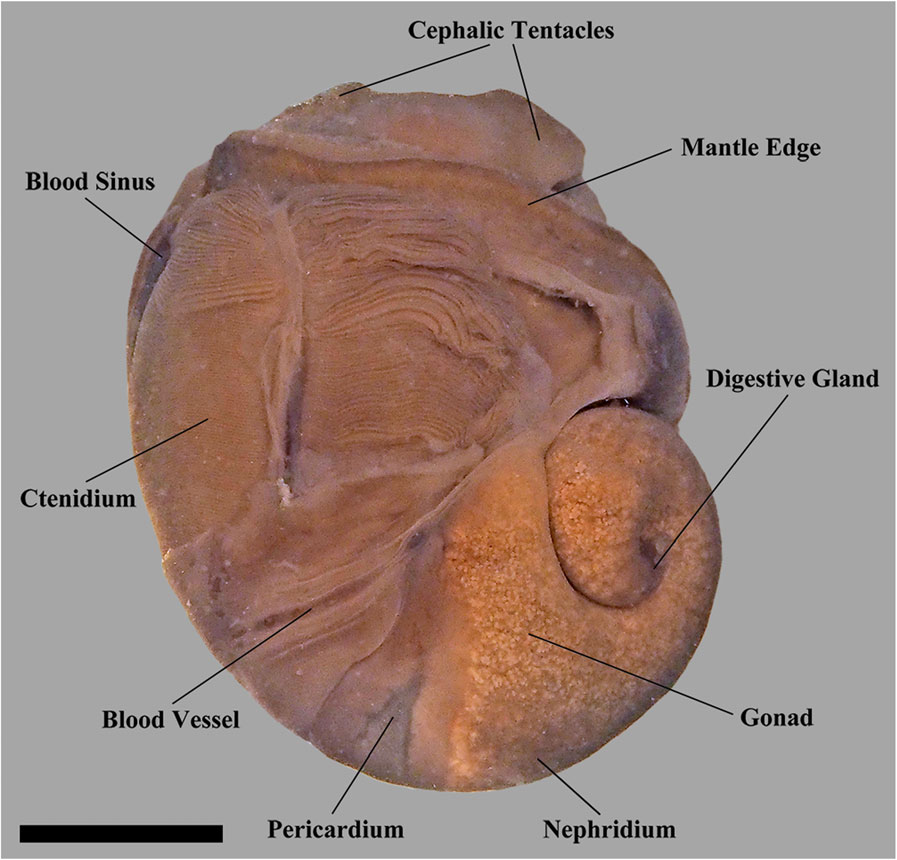
Dorsal view of Gigantopelta chessoia showing a mantle cavity overview. The shell and mantle tissue have been removed. Scale bar is 1 cm.

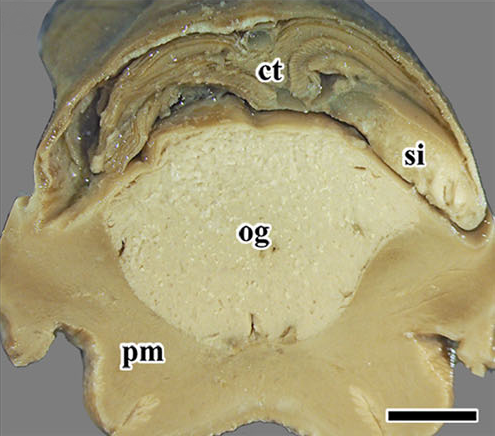
Cross section of Gigantopelta chessoia showing enlarged oesophageal gland (og). ct – ctenidium, si – blood sinus, pm – pedal muscle. The scale bar is 1 cm.

The color of the shell is dark olive. The shell has three to four whorls. The width of the shell is from 4.21–45.7 mm. Body size of the juvenile snail is 2 mm, while body size of the adult is 50 mm.

It has non-papillate tentacles.

The digestive system: there is one pair of radula cartilages. The digestive tract is short and consist of a single loop. The rectum does not penetrate the heart. The radula consist of 1.4% of body volume in juveniles and radula cartilages consist of 2.6% of body volume in juveniles.

The respiratory system consist of single left bipectinate ctenidium (gill).

The circulatory system is hypertrophied: heart is greatly enlarged. The ventricle is 0.42 mm in juvenile animal length of 2.0 mm. The ventricle grows to the size 6 mm in adults. There is a single left auricle. Gigantopelta chessoia has symbiotic bacteria in its enlarged oesophageal gland. The body of Gigantopelta chessoia has low values of carbon isotope δ13C. This indicates that carbon fixation in Gigantopelta chessoia can occur via Calvin-Benson-Bassham cycle by endosymbiotic Gammaproteobacteria. The occurrence of endosymbiont bacteria in the oesophageal gland was confirmed by transmission electron microscopy in 2017.

The oesophageal gland is fused and enlarged to fill the entire ventral side of mantle cavity. It is occupying 0.6% of visceral mass volume in juveniles, while it is increasing allometrically up to 9% visceral mass volume in adults. Blood sinuses are large, but few and fixed in position.

The nervous system has ganglia.

The sensory organs of Gigantopelta chessoia include statocysts with statolith.

The reproductive system has fully developed gonads in juveniles at body size 2.0 mm.

== Ecology ==
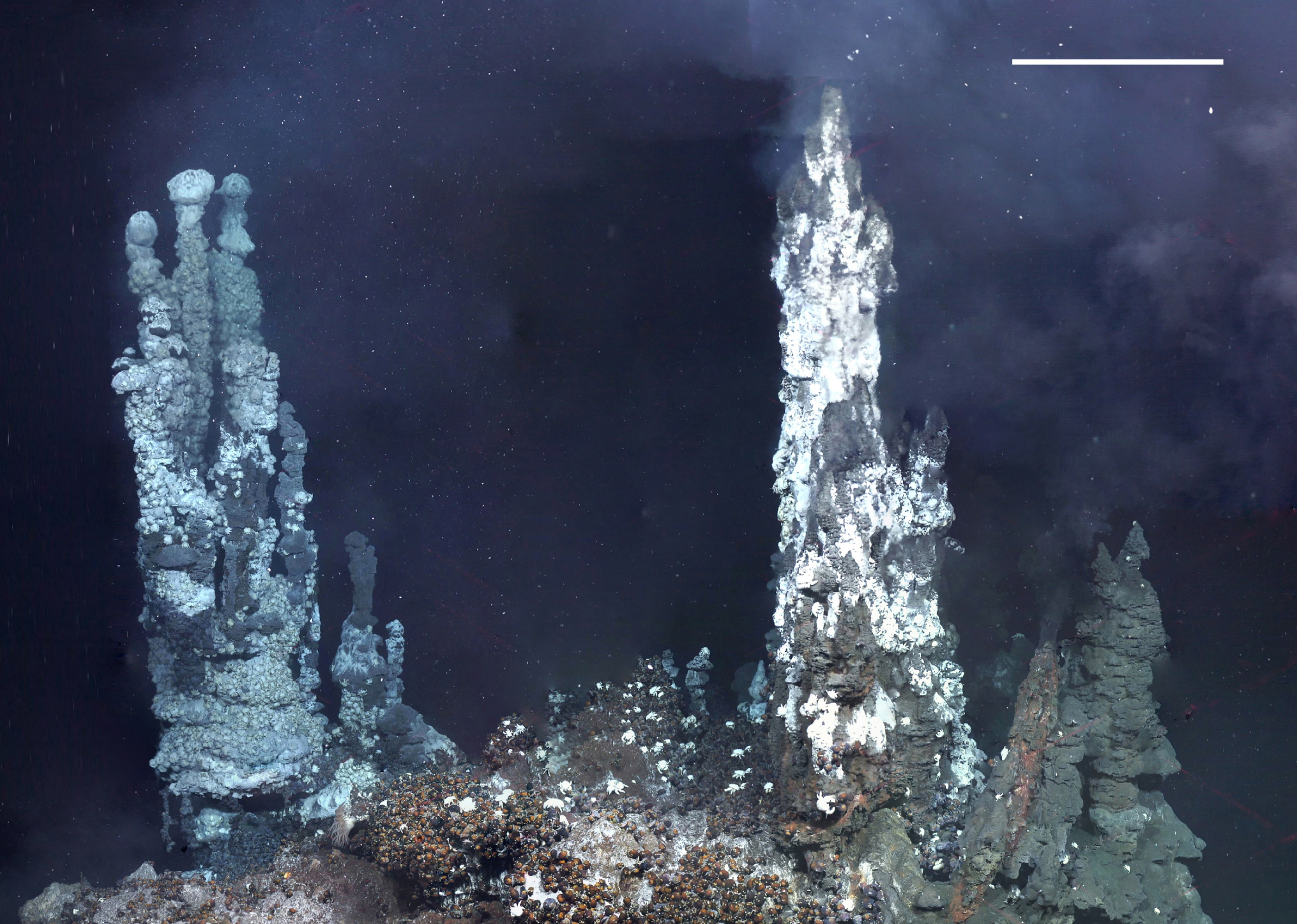
This area between hydrothermal vent chimneys on the E9 site at a depth of 2,398 m is occupied by Gigantopelta chessoia. Scale bar is 1 m.

This gastropod is generally found in dense aggregations up to ~1,000 m^{−2}.

Small limpets Lepetodrilus sp. East Scotia Ridge are sometimes found on the shells of Gigantopelta chessoia. Other marine fauna, such as actinostolid sea anemones (family Actinostolidae), crabs in the genus Kiwa, and the pycnogonid arthropod or "sea spider" cf. Sericosura, can be found living together with this species.

Gigantopelta chessoia may be a mixotroph in juvenile life and shifting to obligate symbiotrophy as an adult.

Gigantopelta chessoia is gonochoristic (they have distinct males and females).
