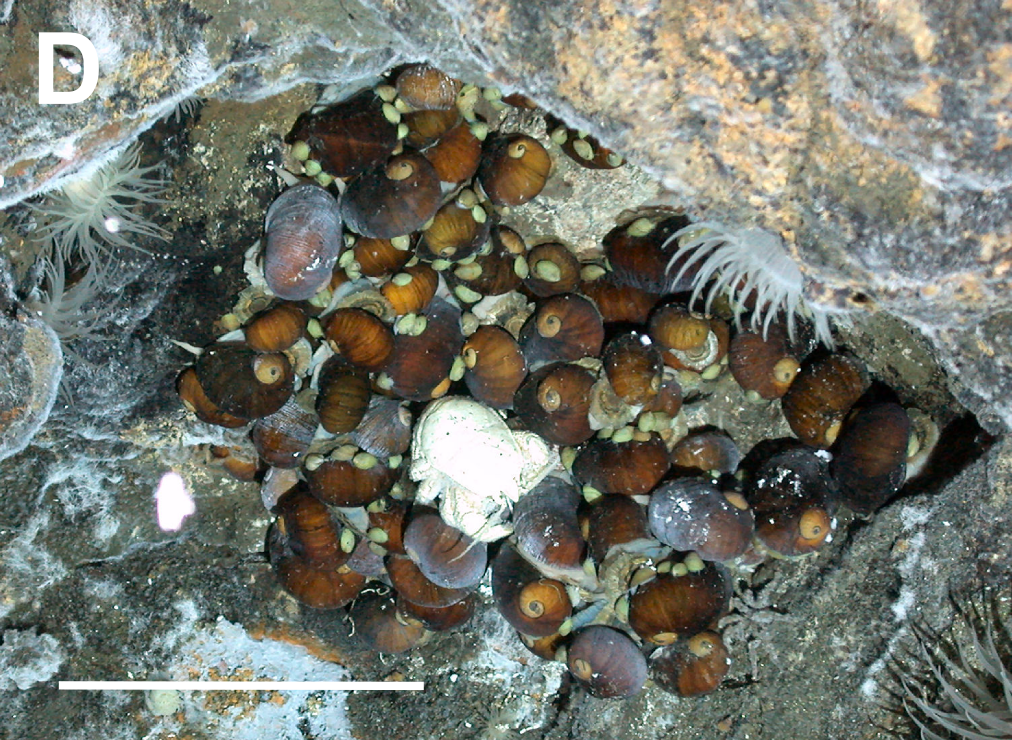
- Numerous individuals of the hydrothermal vent limpet Lepetodrilus sp. partially cover the shells of Gigantopelta chessoia on the East Scotia Ridge site E2 in the Scotia Sea

Scientific classification
- Kingdom: Animalia
- Phylum: Mollusca
- Class: Gastropoda
- Subclass: Vetigastropoda
- Order: Lepetellida
- Superfamily: Lepetodriloidea
- Family: Lepetodrilidae; McLean, 1988

Synonyms
- Clypeosectidae McLean, 1989; Gorgoleptidae McLean, 1988

= Lepetodrilidae =

Lepetodrilidae Temporal range: Cenozoic–Recent

Family of gastropods

Lepetodrilidae is a family of small, deep-sea sea snails, hydrothermal vent limpets, marine gastropod molluscs in the clade Vetigastropoda (according to the taxonomy of the Gastropoda by Bouchet & Rocroi, 2005).

This family has no subfamilies.

== Description ==
These deep-sea species are found and are endemic at hydrothermal vents. Their limpet-shaped shell consist of non-nacreous aragonite. The thick periostracum covers the shell edge. The apex is posterior, in some species projecting posteriorly, and deflected to the right. The shell has no sculpture or it consists of beads or imbricate radial ribs. There is no operculum. The muscle scar forms the shape of a horseshoe. The rhipidoglossate radula is special as the lateral teeth descend toward the rachidian in a v-arrangement. The conspicuous penis is situated near the base of the right cephalic tentacle.

== Genera ==
Genera within the family Lepetodrilidae include:

- Clypeosectus McLean, 1989
- Gorgoleptis McLean, 1988
- Lepetodrilus McLean, 1988
- Pseudorimula McLean, 1989
