= James Hamilton McLean =

American malacologist (1936–2016)

- Born: June 17, 1936
- Died: November 11, 2016 (aged 80)
- Known for: Marine gastropods; hydrothermal vent limpets
- Scientific career
- Fields: Malacology
- Institutions: Natural History Museum of Los Angeles County
- Author abbrev. (botany): McLean

James Hamilton McLean (17 June 1936 – 11 November 2016) was an American malacologist (a biologist who studies mollusks). He specialized in marine gastropods. He worked on many families of Eastern Pacific gastropods including the Fissurellidae, Trochidae, Turbinidae and Liotiidae, and also investigated deep sea gastropods from hydrothermal vents.

McLean worked as a curator of the Natural History Museum of Los Angeles County from 1964 to 2001 and was a curator emeritus there until his death in November 2016.

== Molluscs described ==
McLean, often together with other malacologists, described, according to the database WoRMS, 385 new taxa.

At least 37 taxa were named for James McLean with the epithet macleani (according to WoRMS)

He named numerous taxa of marine gastropods including:

- Clypeosectidae McLean, 1989, a family of hydrothermal vent limpets

== Bibliography ==
- Handbook, 1969, revised in 1978, Marine Shells of Southern California
- Geiger D. L. & McLean J. H. (10 February 2010) "New species and records of Scissurellidae and Anatomidae from the Americas (Mollusca: Gastropoda: Vetigastropoda)". Zootaxa 2356: 1-35, 24 plates. preview.
