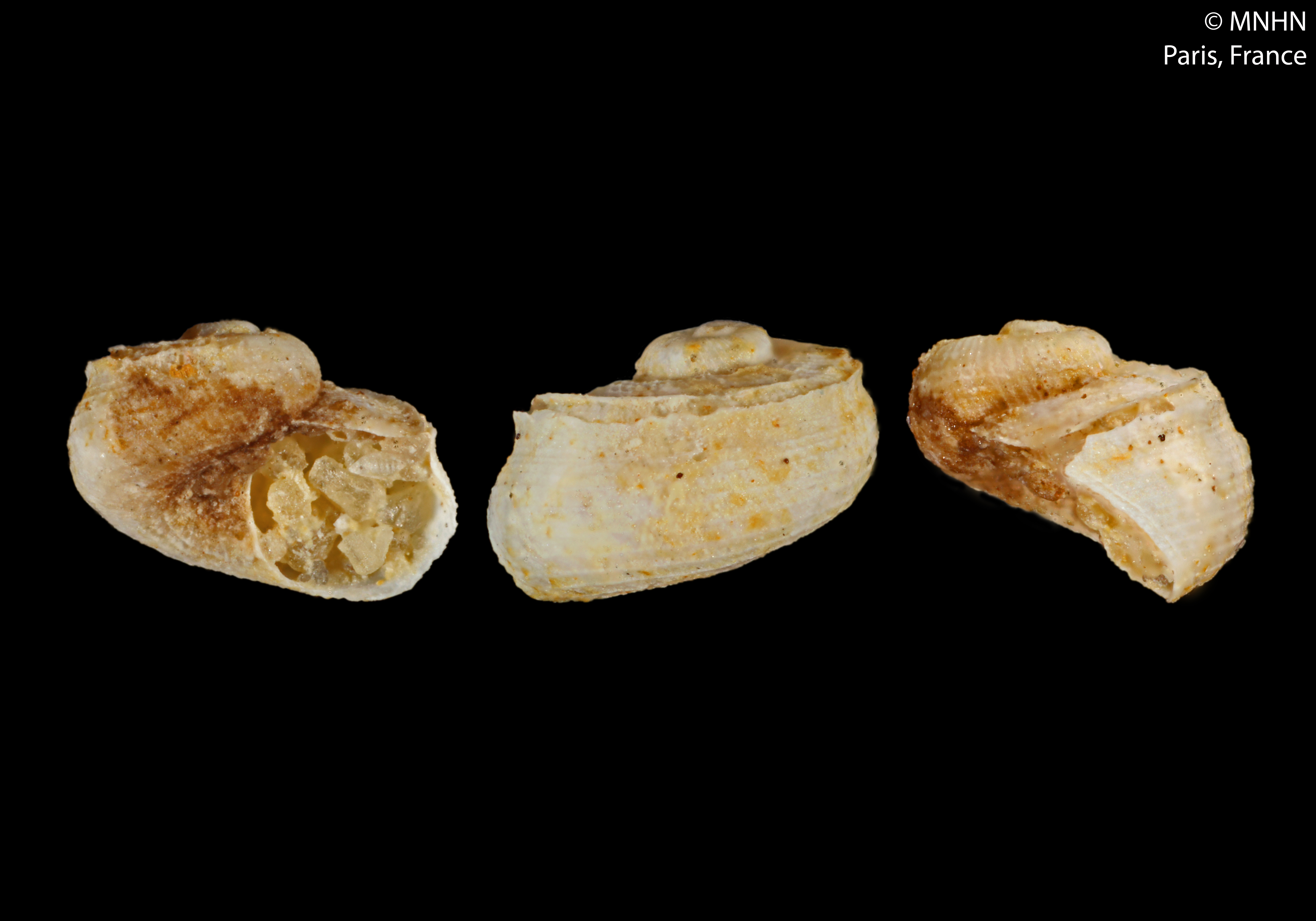
- Three views of shell Scissurella deshayesi

Scientific classification
- Kingdom: Animalia
- Phylum: Mollusca
- Class: Gastropoda
- Subclass: Vetigastropoda
- Order: Lepetellida; Moskalev, 1971

= Lepetellida =

Order of gastropods

Lepetellida is a taxonomic order of small sea snails, marine gastropod mollusks or micromollusks in the subclass Vetigastropoda.

== Superfamilies ==
- Fissurelloidea J. Fleming, 1822
- Haliotoidea Rafinesque, 1815
- Lepetelloidea Dall, 1882
- Lepetodriloidea J. H. McLean, 1988
- Scissurelloidea Gray, 1847
