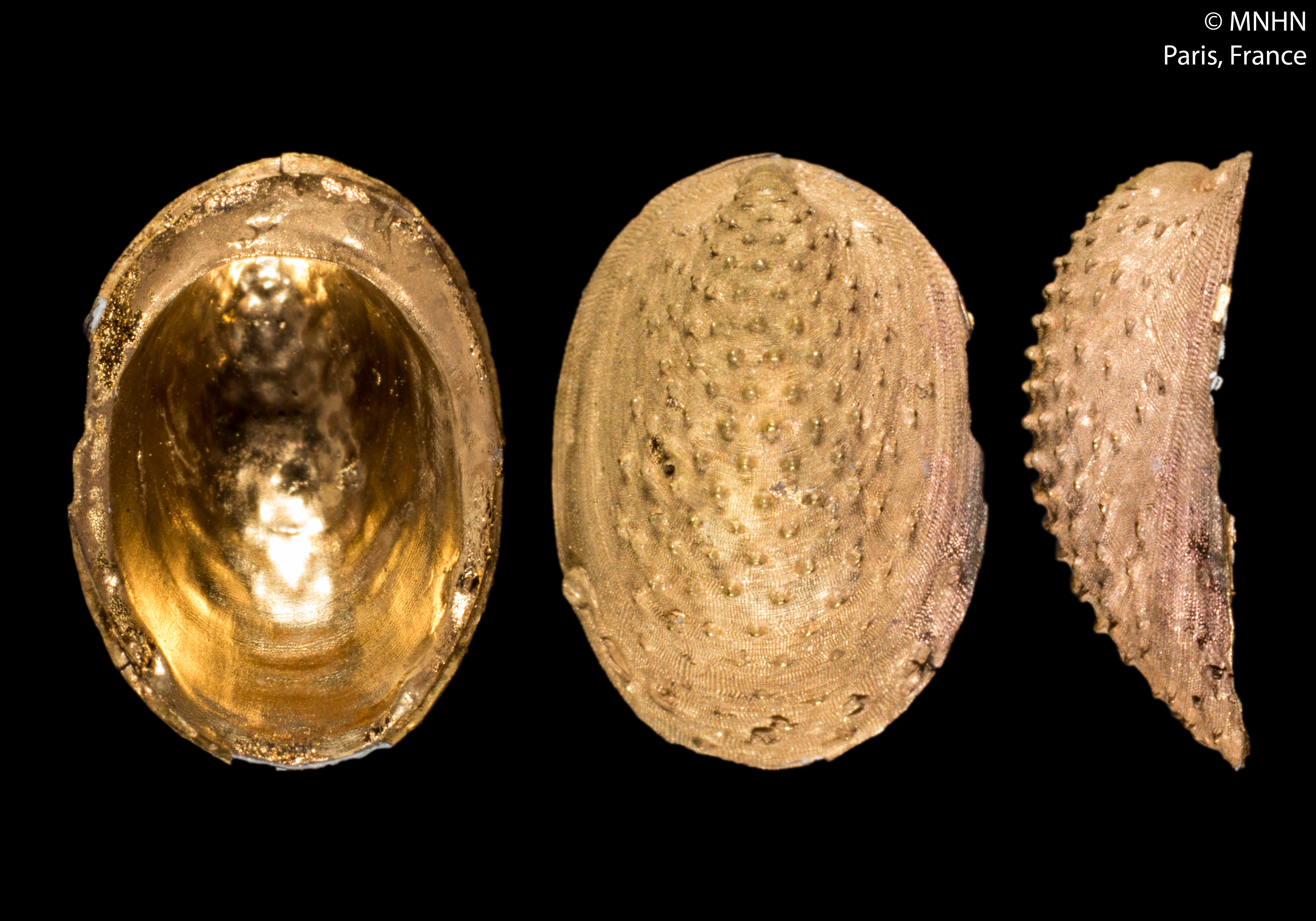
- Shell of Nodopelta rigneae (holotype at MNHN, Paris)

Scientific classification
- Kingdom: Animalia
- Phylum: Mollusca
- Class: Gastropoda
- Subclass: Vetigastropoda
- Family: Peltospiridae
- Genus: Nodopelta
- Species: N. rigneae

Binomial name
- Nodopelta rigneae Warén & Bouchet, 2001

= Nodopelta rigneae =

Species of gastropod

Nodopelta rigneae is a species of sea snail, a marine gastropod mollusc in the family Peltospiridae.

== Description ==
The length of the shell attains 8.7 mm.

== Distribution ==
This marine species was found on the East Pacific Rise.
