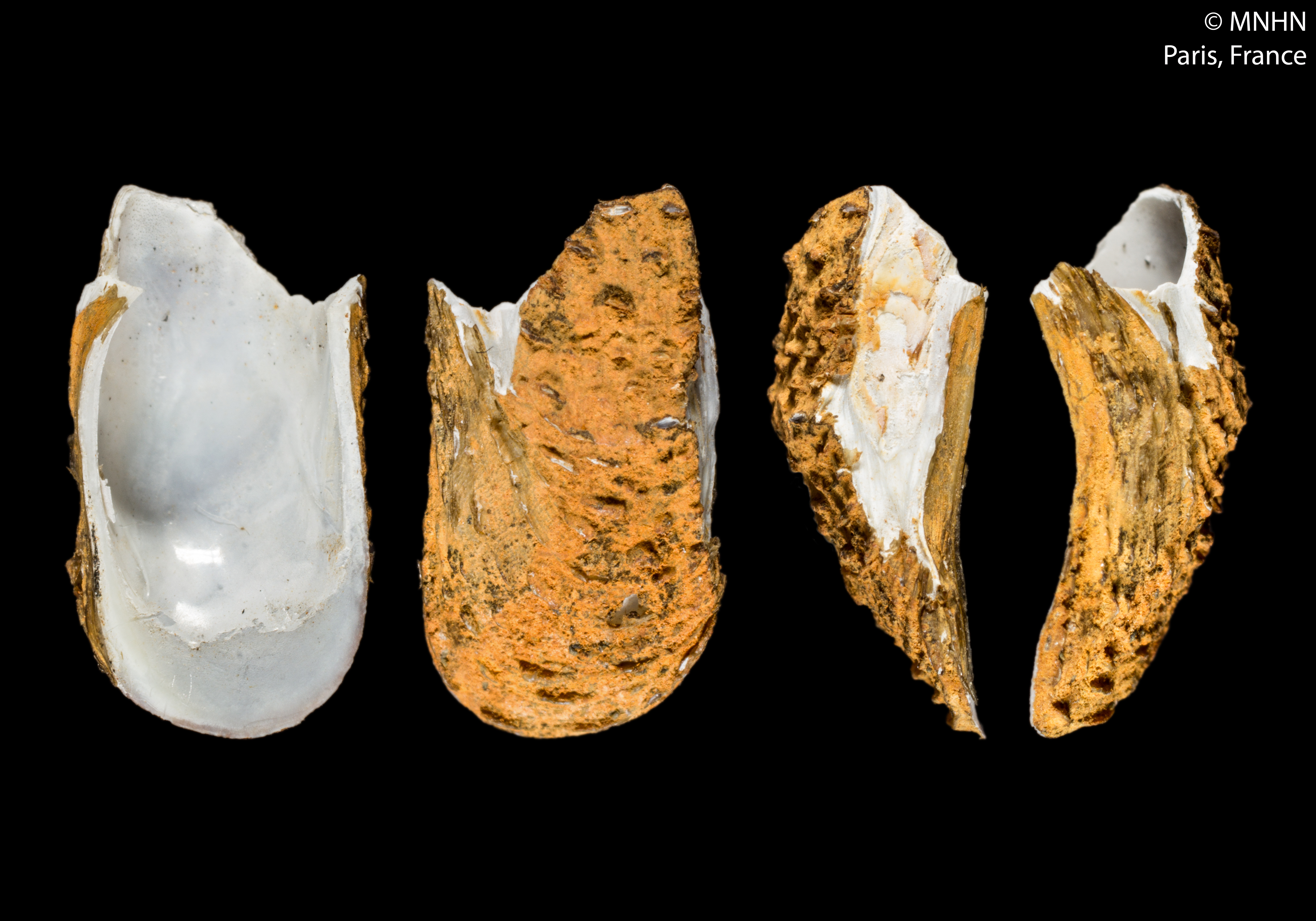
- Shell of Hirtopelta hirta (holotype at MNHN, Paris)

Scientific classification
- Kingdom: Animalia
- Phylum: Mollusca
- Class: Gastropoda
- Subclass: Vetigastropoda
- Family: Peltospiridae
- Genus: Hirtopelta
- Species: H. hirta

Binomial name
- Hirtopelta hirta McLean, 1989

= Hirtopelta hirta =

Species of sea snail in the family Peltospiridae

Hirtopelta hirta is a species of sea snail, a marine gastropod mollusc in the family Peltospiridae.

== Description ==
The length of the shell attains 11.5 mm.

== Distribution ==
It has been found living on the East Pacific Rise and the shells grow up to 12mm.
