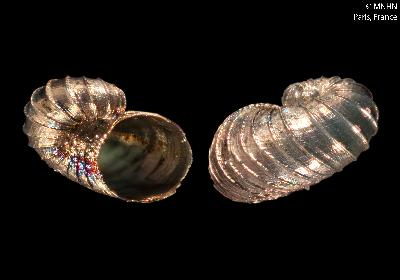

Conservation status
- Critically Endangered (IUCN 3.1)

Scientific classification
- Kingdom: Animalia
- Phylum: Mollusca
- Class: Gastropoda
- Subclass: Vetigastropoda
- Family: Neomphalidae
- Genus: Planorbidella
- Species: P. depressa

Binomial name
- Planorbidella depressa Warén & Bouchet, 1993

= Planorbidella depressa =

Species of gastropod

Planorbidella depressa is a species of sea snail, a marine gastropod mollusc in the family Neomphalidae.

== Description ==
The shell can grow to be 1.6 mm in length.

== Distribution ==
Planorbidella depressa is a benthic species that can be found in the Lau Basin at depths around 1,900 metres (6,200 ft).
