= Hirtopelta tufari =

Scientific classification
- Kingdom: Animalia
- Phylum: Mollusca
- Class: Gastropoda
- Subclass: Vetigastropoda
- Family: Peltospiridae
- Genus: Hirtopelta
- Species: H. tufari

Binomial name
- Hirtopelta tufari Beck, 2002

Species of gastropod

Hirtopelta tufari is a species of sea snail, a marine gastropod mollusc in the family Peltospiridae.

== Distribution ==
Hirtopelta tufari lives in hot vent sites in the East Pacific Rise.

== Description ==
The gill of Hirtopelta tufari is enlarged and there are bacterial endosymbions in the gill. Endosymbiotic bacteria provide nutrition to the snail.
