= Peltospira lamellifera =

Scientific classification
- Kingdom: Animalia
- Phylum: Mollusca
- Class: Gastropoda
- Subclass: Vetigastropoda
- Family: Peltospiridae
- Genus: Peltospira
- Species: P. lamellifera

Binomial name
- Peltospira lamellifera Warén & Bouchet, 1989

Species of gastropod

Peltospira lamellifera is a species of sea snail, a marine gastropod mollusk in the family Peltospiridae.
