= Lirapex humatus =

Scientific classification
- Kingdom: Animalia
- Phylum: Mollusca
- Class: Gastropoda
- Subclass: Vetigastropoda
- Family: Peltospiridae
- Genus: Lirapex
- Species: L. humatus

Binomial name
- Lirapex humatus Warén & Bouchet, 2001

Synonyms
- Lirapex humata Warén & Bouchet, 1989 (wrong grammatical agreement in original description)

Species of gastropod

Lirapex humatus is a species of sea snail, a marine gastropod mollusc in the family Peltospiridae.

== Distribution ==
This marine species occurs on the East Pacific Rise.

- Warén A. & Bouchet P. (2001). Gastropoda and Monoplacophora from hydrothermal vents and seeps new taxa and records. The Veliger, 44(2): 116-231
