= Lacunoides vitreus =

Scientific classification
- Kingdom: Animalia
- Phylum: Mollusca
- Class: Gastropoda
- Subclass: Vetigastropoda
- Family: Neomphalidae
- Genus: Lacunoides
- Species: L. vitreus

Binomial name
- Lacunoides vitreus Warén & Bouchet, 2001

Species of gastropod

Lacunoides vitreus is a species of sea snail, a marine gastropod mollusk in the family Neomphalidae.
