= Nodopelta heminoda =

Scientific classification
- Kingdom: Animalia
- Phylum: Mollusca
- Class: Gastropoda
- Subclass: Vetigastropoda
- Family: Peltospiridae
- Genus: Nodopelta
- Species: N. heminoda

Binomial name
- Nodopelta heminoda McLean, 1989

Species of gastropod

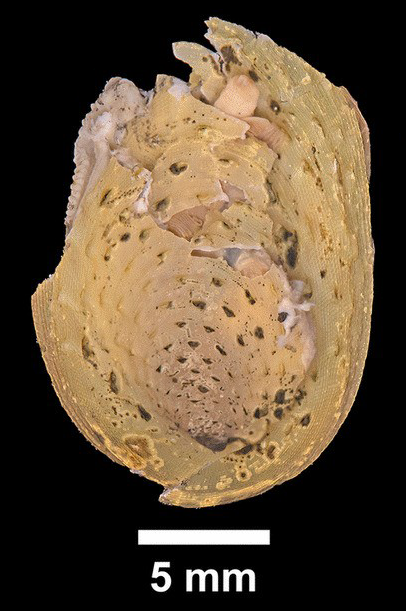
Inner shell of a Nodopelta heminoda

Nodopelta heminoda is a species of sea snail, a marine gastropod mollusc in the family Peltospiridae.

== Description ==
Nodopelta heminoda is a non-documented species.
