= Lirapex granularis =

Scientific classification
- Kingdom: Animalia
- Phylum: Mollusca
- Class: Gastropoda
- Subclass: Vetigastropoda
- Family: Peltospiridae
- Genus: Lirapex
- Species: L. granularis

Binomial name
- Lirapex granularis Warén & Bouchet, 1989

Species of gastropod

Lirapex granularis is a species of sea snail, a marine gastropod mollusc in the family Peltospiridae.
