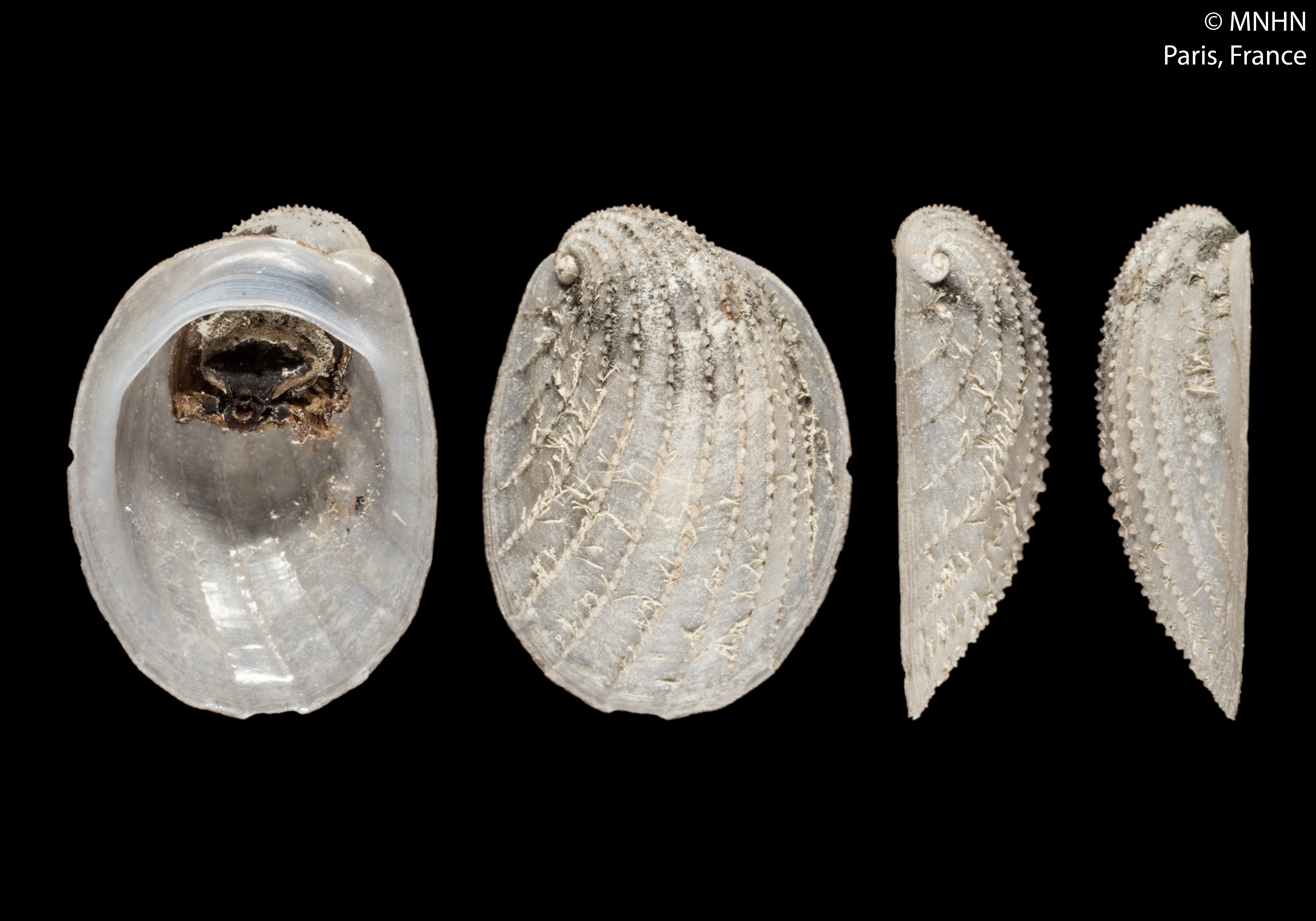
- Shell of Ctenopelta porifera (holotype at MNHN, Paris)

Scientific classification
- Kingdom: Animalia
- Phylum: Mollusca
- Class: Gastropoda
- Subclass: Vetigastropoda
- Family: Peltospiridae
- Genus: Ctenopelta
- Species: C. porifera

Binomial name
- Ctenopelta porifera Warén & Bouchet, 1993

= Ctenopelta porifera =

Species of gastropod

Ctenopelta porifera is a species of sea snail, a marine gastropod mollusk in the family Peltospiridae.

== Description ==
The length of the shell attains 10.6 mm.

== Distribution ==
It is a pioneer species at hydrothermal vents in East Pacific Rise.
