= Echinopelta fistulosa =

Scientific classification
- Kingdom: Animalia
- Phylum: Mollusca
- Class: Gastropoda
- Subclass: Vetigastropoda
- Family: Peltospiridae
- Genus: Echinopelta
- Species: E. fistulosa

Binomial name
- Echinopelta fistulosa McLean, 1989

Species of gastropod

Echinopelta fistulosa is a species of sea snail, a marine gastropod mollusk in the family Peltospiridae.
