= Symmetromphalus regularis =

Scientific classification
- Kingdom: Animalia
- Phylum: Mollusca
- Class: Gastropoda
- Subclass: Vetigastropoda
- Family: Neomphalidae
- Genus: Symmetromphalus
- Species: S. regularis

Binomial name
- Symmetromphalus regularis McLean, 1990

Species of gastropod

Symmetromphalus regularis is a species of sea snail, a marine gastropod mollusc in the family Neomphalidae.
