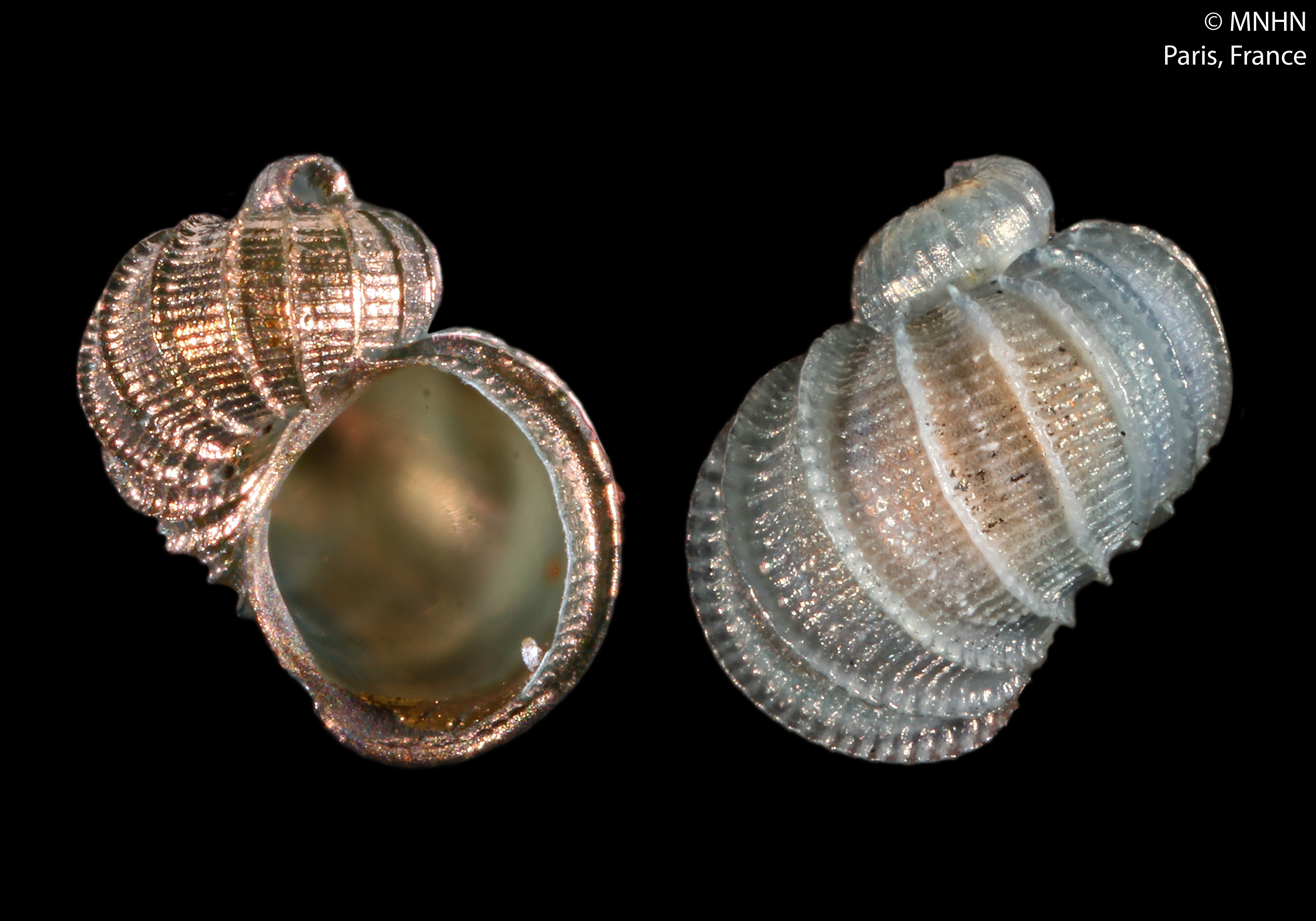
- Shell of Pachydermia sculpta (holotype at MNHN, Paris)

Scientific classification
- Kingdom: Animalia
- Phylum: Mollusca
- Class: Gastropoda
- Subclass: Vetigastropoda
- Family: Peltospiridae
- Genus: Pachydermia
- Species: P. sculpta

Binomial name
- Pachydermia sculpta Warén & Bouchet, 1993

= Pachydermia sculpta =

Species of gastropod

Pachydermia sculpta is a species of sea snail, a marine gastropod mollusk in the family Peltospiridae.

== Description ==
The length of the shell attains 2.8 mm.

== Distribution ==
This marine species was found in the North Fiji Basin at a depth of 2,000 m.
