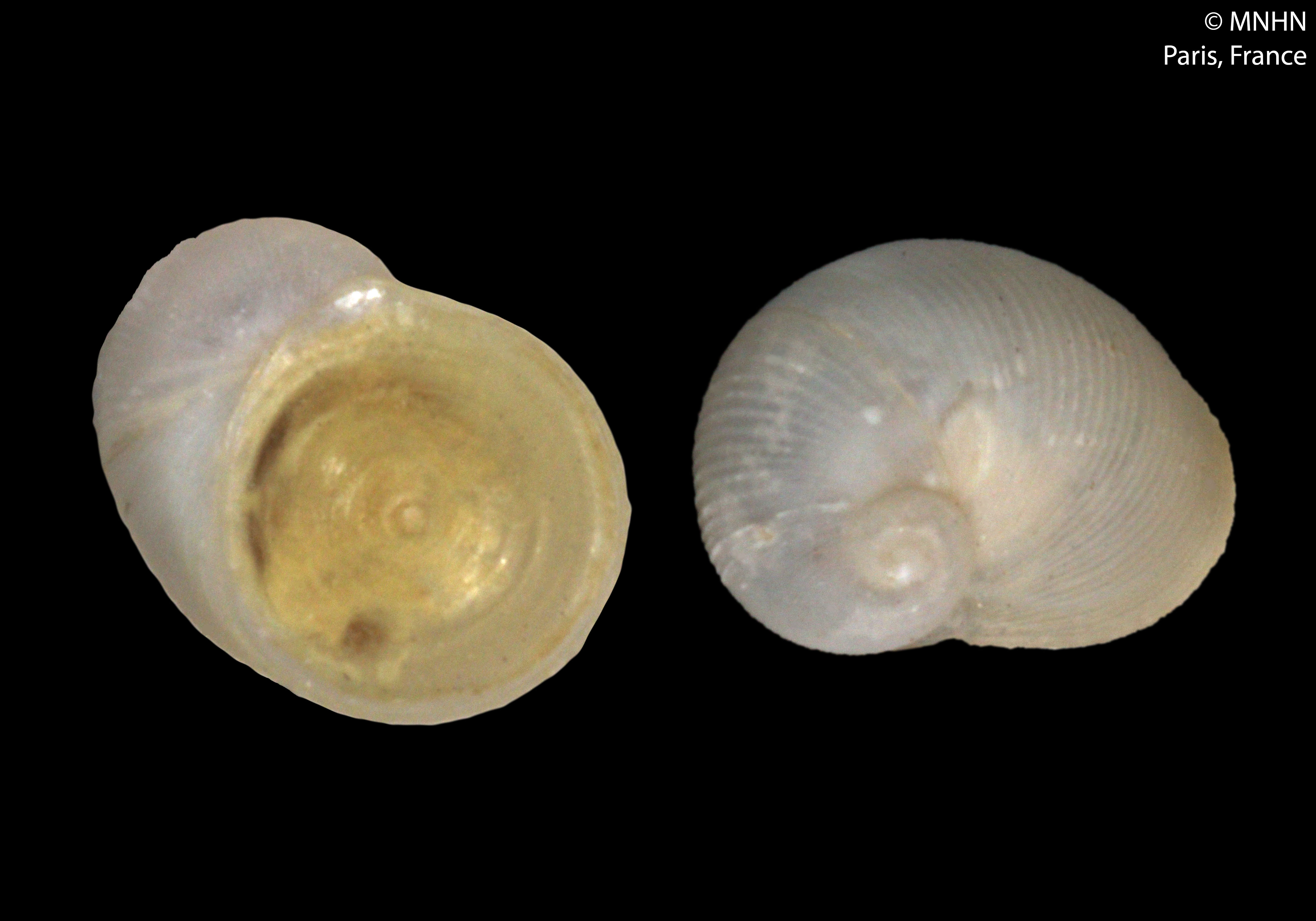
- Shell of Lacunoides exquisitus (paratype at MNHN, Paris)

Scientific classification
- Kingdom: Animalia
- Phylum: Mollusca
- Class: Gastropoda
- Subclass: Vetigastropoda
- Family: Neomphalidae
- Genus: Lacunoides
- Species: L. exquisitus

Binomial name
- Lacunoides exquisitus Warén & Bouchet, 1989

= Lacunoides exquisitus =

Species of gastropod

Lacunoides exquisitus is a deep-sea, hydrothermal species of sea snail, a marine gastropod mollusc in the family Neomphalidae.

== Description ==
It is characterized by a very small, flattened shell (up to about 2.24 mm in diameter) that resembles a Limpet's shell in genus Lacuna and specialized soft anatomy. It is colorless and thin, with a structure of fine axial and spiral threads on the whorls. The aperture is round and oblique, and adults lack any open umbilicus. The periostracum is very thin and the shell is not nacreous.

== Distribution ==
This marine species occurs off the Galapagos Islands at a depth of 2,480 m.
