= Neomphalus fretterae =

Scientific classification
- Kingdom: Animalia
- Phylum: Mollusca
- Class: Gastropoda
- Subclass: Vetigastropoda
- Family: Neomphalidae
- Genus: Neomphalus
- Species: N. fretterae

Binomial name
- Neomphalus fretterae McLean, 1981

Species of gastropod

Neomphalus fretterae is a species of sea snail, a marine gastropod mollusk in the family Neomphalidae.

This species common name is the Galapagos rift limpet

This animal was found living within the subseafloor crust beneath hydrothermal vents, along with many others.
