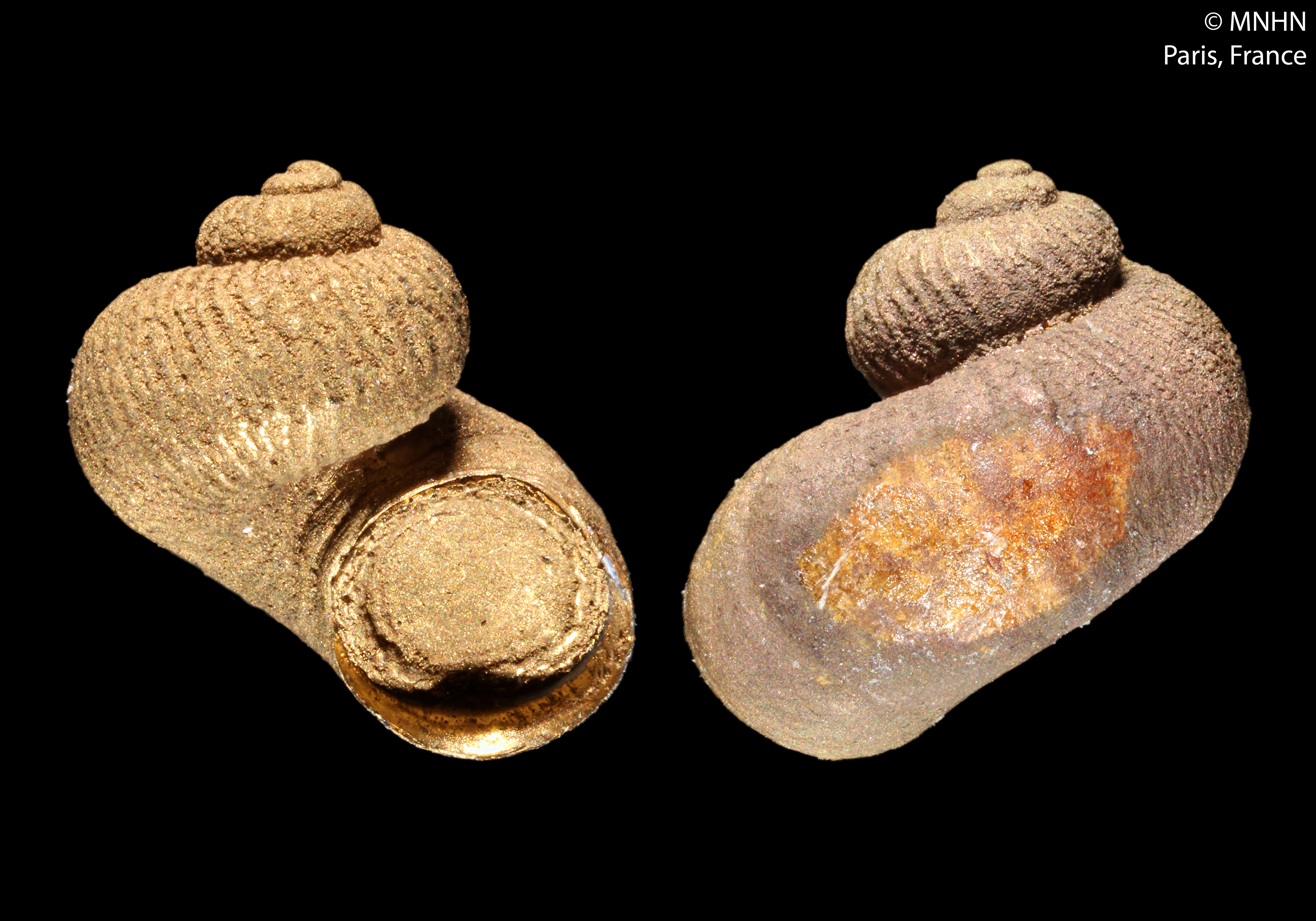
- Shell of Lirapex costellatus (holotype at MNHN, Paris)

Scientific classification
- Kingdom: Animalia
- Phylum: Mollusca
- Class: Gastropoda
- Subclass: Vetigastropoda
- Family: Peltospiridae
- Genus: Lirapex
- Species: L. costellatus

Binomial name
- Lirapex costellatus Warén & Bouchet, 2001

Synonyms
- Lirapex costellata Warén & Bouchet, 1989

= Lirapex costellatus =

Species of gastropod

Lirapex costellatus is a species of sea snail, a marine gastropod mollusc in the family Peltospiridae.

== Description ==
The length of the shell attains 3.6 mm. Lirapex costellatus form shallow marine sediments. It is a chemosymbiotroph. It has sexual reproduction.

== Distribution ==
This marine species occurs on the Mid-Atlantic Ridge at a depth of 685 m.
