= Symmetromphalus hageni =

Scientific classification
- Kingdom: Animalia
- Phylum: Mollusca
- Class: Gastropoda
- Subclass: Vetigastropoda
- Family: Neomphalidae
- Genus: Symmetromphalus
- Species: S. hageni

Binomial name
- Symmetromphalus hageni Beck, 1992

Species of gastropod

Symmetromphalus hageni is a species of sea snail in the family Neomphalidae.

== Distribution ==
Symmetromphalus hageni lives in hot vent sites in the Bismarck Sea.
