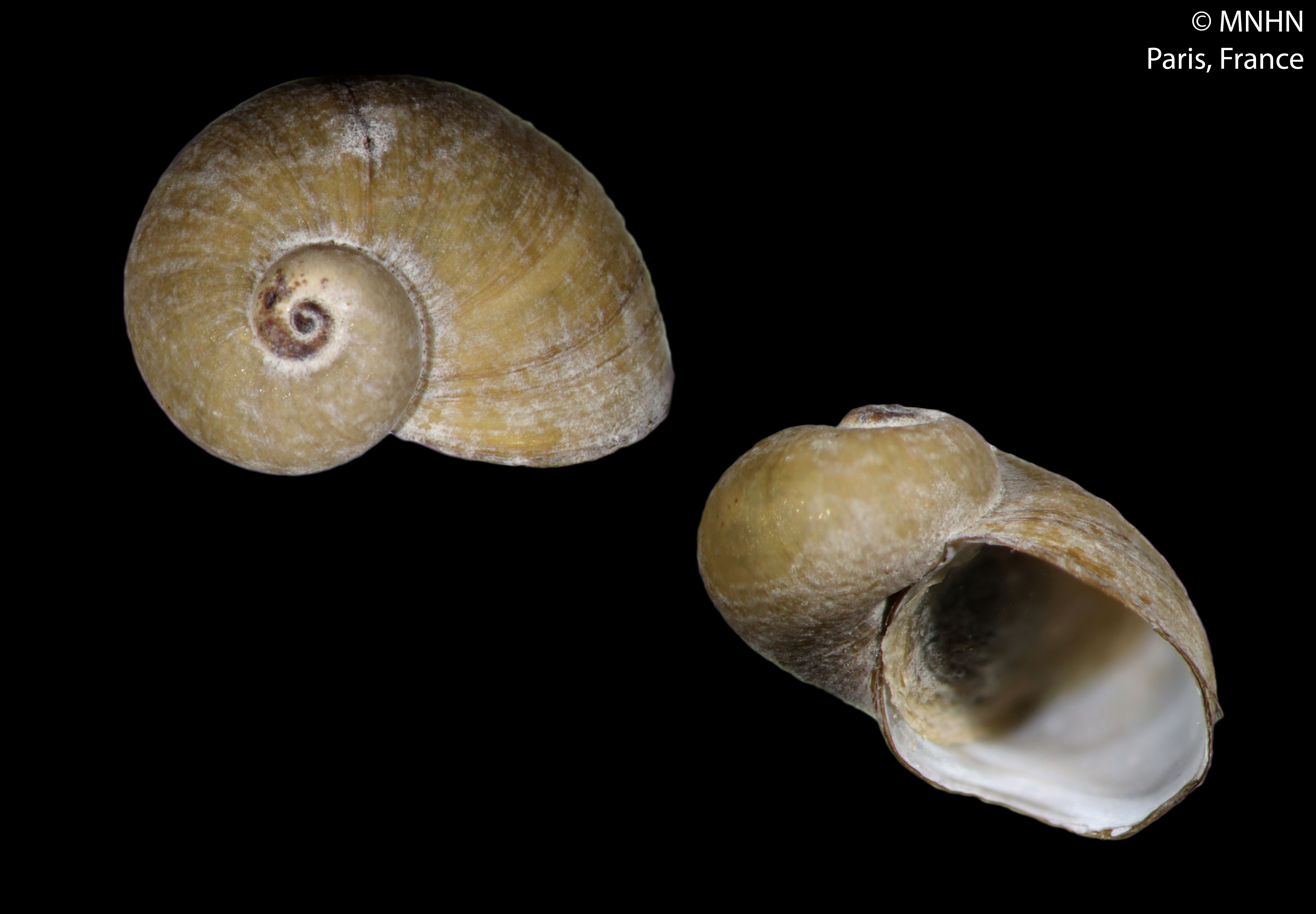
- Depressigyra globulus

Scientific classification
- Kingdom: Animalia
- Phylum: Mollusca
- Class: Gastropoda
- Subclass: Vetigastropoda
- Family: Peltospiridae
- Genus: Depressigyra; Warén & Bouchet, 1989

= Depressigyra =

Genus of gastropods

Depressigyra is a genus of sea snails, marine gastropod mollusks in the family Peltospiridae.

== Species ==
Species within the genus Depressigyra include:

- Depressigyra globulus Warén & Bouchet, 1989

Species brought into synonymy

- Depressigyra planispira Warén & Bouchet, 1989: synonym of Planorbidella planispira (Warén & Bouchet, 1989)
