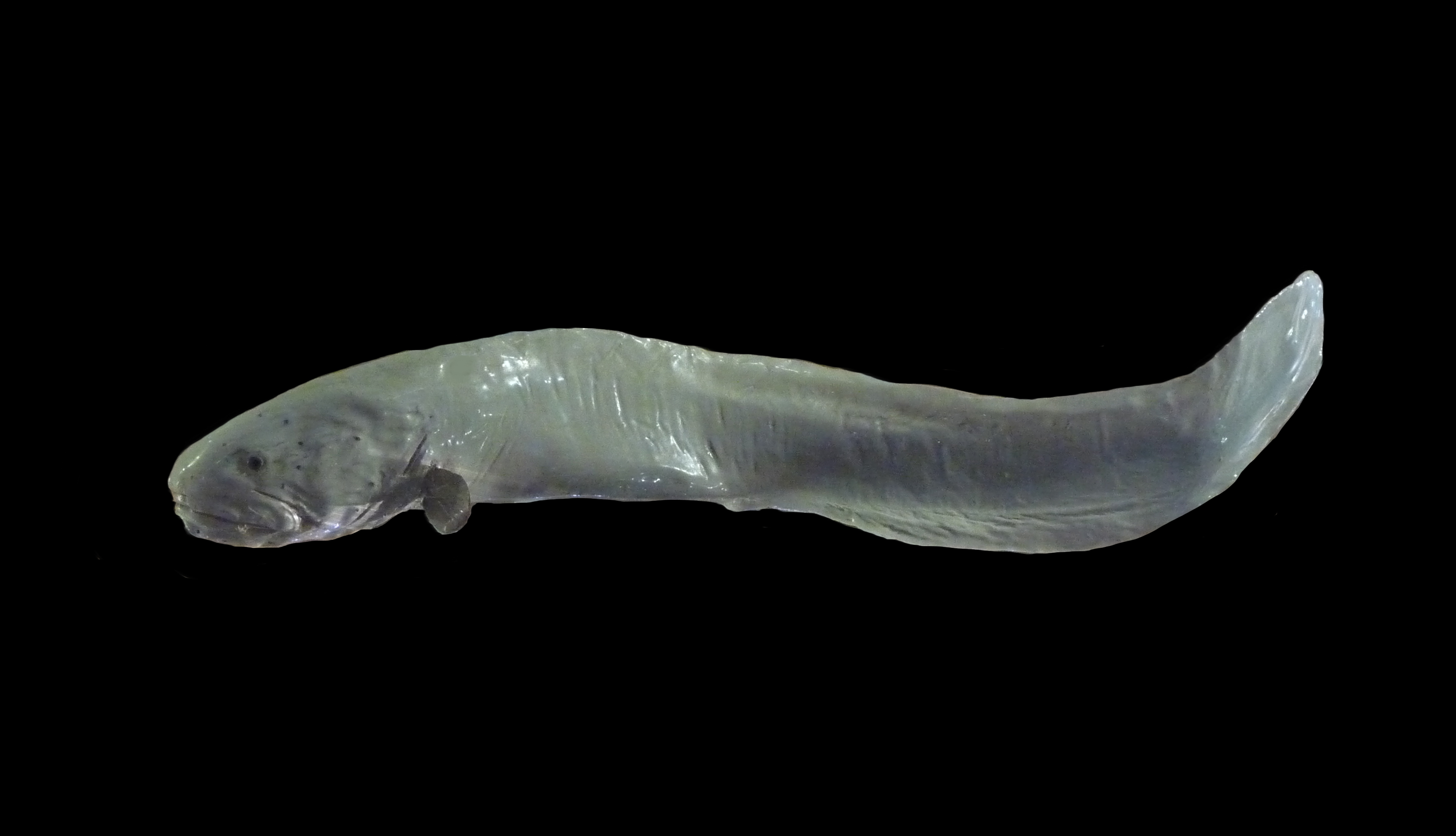

Scientific classification
- Kingdom: Animalia
- Phylum: Chordata
- Class: Actinopterygii
- Order: Perciformes
- Family: Zoarcidae
- Genus: Thermarces
- Species: T. cerberus

Binomial name
- Thermarces cerberus Rosenblatt & Cohen, 1986

= Thermarces cerberus =

Species of fish

Thermarces cerberus is a species of ray-finned fish in the family Zoarcidae. This fish, commonly known as the pink vent fish, is associated with hydrothermal vents and cold seeps at bathypelagic depths in the East Pacific.

== Distribution ==
Thermarces cerberus is found at great depths on the East Pacific Rise and the Galapagos Rift in the eastern Pacific Ocean.

== Ecology ==
One of the places where Thermarces cerberus has been found is in the vicinity of subterranean vents on the Alarcón Rise, near the mouth of the Gulf of California at depths of about 2,300 metres (7,500 ft). Here there are active and inactive "chimneys" in close proximity to long fissures in the seabed. The most vigorous active chimneys emit mineral-rich fluids at over 300 °C (572 °F) known as "black smoke" while less active chimneys emit "white smoke". The active chimneys are covered in mats of bacteria and tufts of giant tube worms (Riftia pachyptila). Growing on the tube worms, some of which are 1.5 metres (5 ft) tall, are numerous limpets. Moving about among the worms are the crab Bythograea thermydron, crabs in the family Galatheidae and the pink vent fish.

At vents on the East Pacific Rise, the pink vent fish feeds primarily on such molluscs as the limpet Lepetodrilus elevatus and amphipods such as Ventiella sulfuris. Other organisms eaten include the amphipod Halice hesmonectes and the gastropod Cyathermia naticoides. In this location the pink vent fish preferentially takes large limpets, and the removal of these is likely to have a significant effect on biodiversity, enabling other organisms such as the larvae of tube worms to settle, a thing they are normally prevented from doing by the limpets. It has been suggested that vent communities represent relict populations and that the organisms found around vents are more closely related to those at other vent systems than they are to the creatures of the surrounding deep sea floor. Vent fauna need good dispersal characteristics so as to be able to colonise newly formed vent systems.
