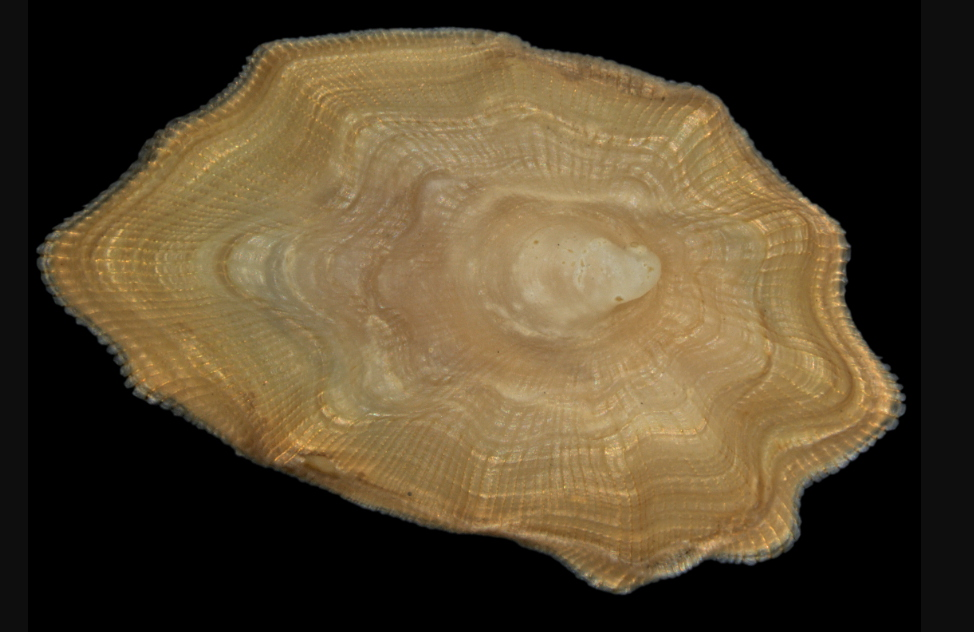
- Shell of Symmetromphalus mcleani (holotype at MNHN, Paris)

Scientific classification
- Kingdom: Animalia
- Phylum: Mollusca
- Class: Gastropoda
- Subclass: Vetigastropoda
- Family: Neomphalidae
- Genus: Symmetromphalus; McLean, 1990

= Symmetromphalus =

Genus of gastropods

Symmetromphalus is a genus of sea snails, marine gastropod molluscs in the family Neomphalidae.

== Species ==
Species within the genus Symmetromphalus include:

- Symmetromphalus hageni Beck, 1992
- Symmetromphalus mcleani L. Beck, 2023
- Symmetromphalus regularis McLean, 1990
