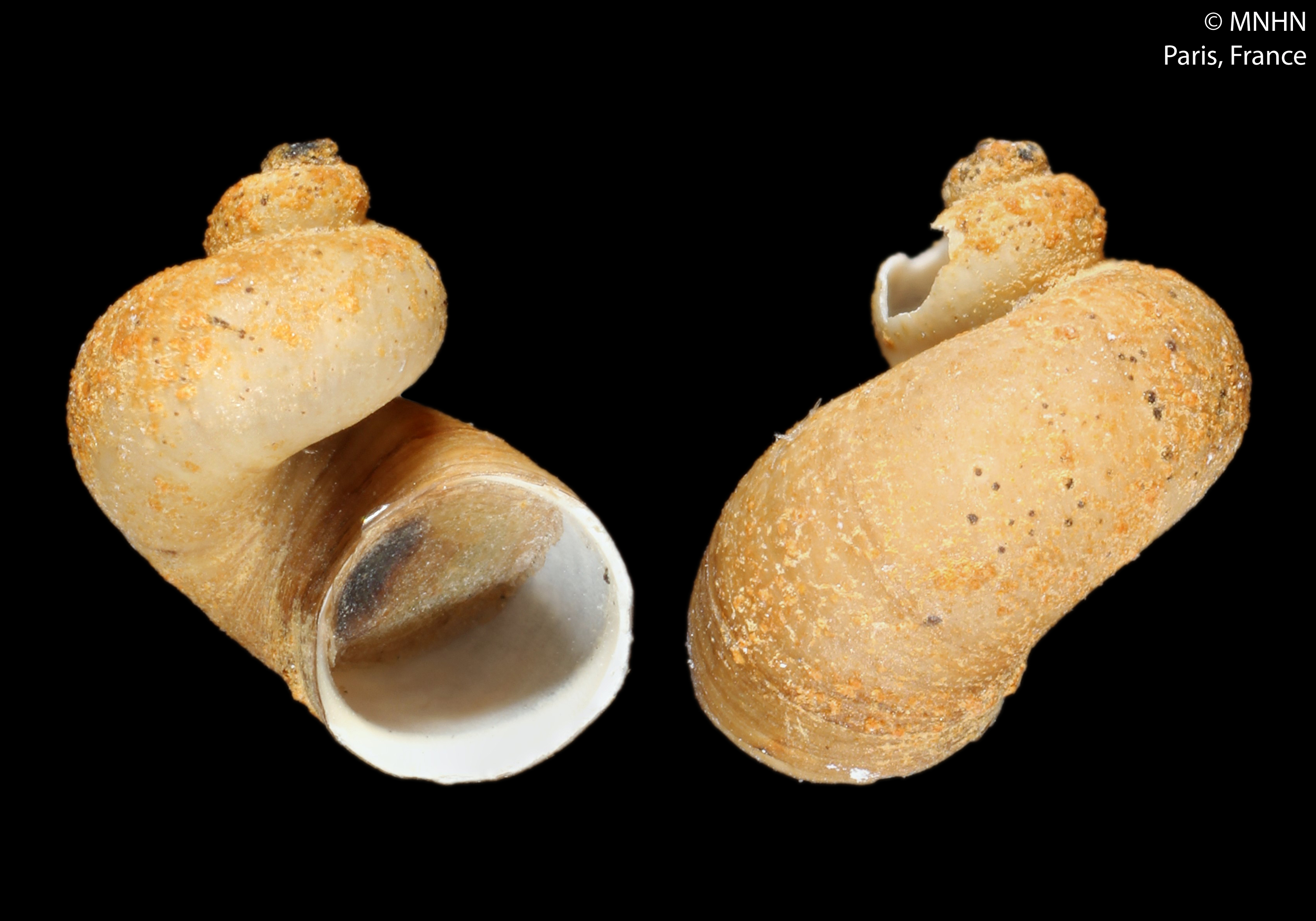
- Shell of Pachydermia laevis (holotype at MNHN, Paris)

Scientific classification
- Kingdom: Animalia
- Phylum: Mollusca
- Class: Gastropoda
- Subclass: Vetigastropoda
- Family: Peltospiridae
- Genus: Pachydermia
- Species: P. laevis

Binomial name
- Pachydermia laevis Warén & Bouchet, 1989

= Pachydermia laevis =

Species of gastropod

Pachydermia laevis is a species of sea snail, a marine gastropod mollusk in the family Peltospiridae.

== Description ==
The length of the shell attains 4.6 mm. The shell has a reticulate sculpture with a proximal region that is strongly marked which becomes finer as it nears the aperture and less distinct. The broad rim of the aperture is slightly curved and tapers toward the inner edge.

== Distribution ==
This marine species was found in hydrothermal vents in the East Pacific Rise at a depth of 2615 m in 1982.
