= Echinopelta =

Scientific classification
- Kingdom: Animalia
- Phylum: Mollusca
- Class: Gastropoda
- Subclass: Vetigastropoda
- Family: Peltospiridae
- Genus: Echinopelta; McLean, 1989

Genus of gastropods

Echinopelta is a genus of sea snails, marine gastropod mollusks in the family Peltospiridae.

== Species ==
Species within the genus Echinopelta include:

- Echinopelta fistulosa McLean, 1989
