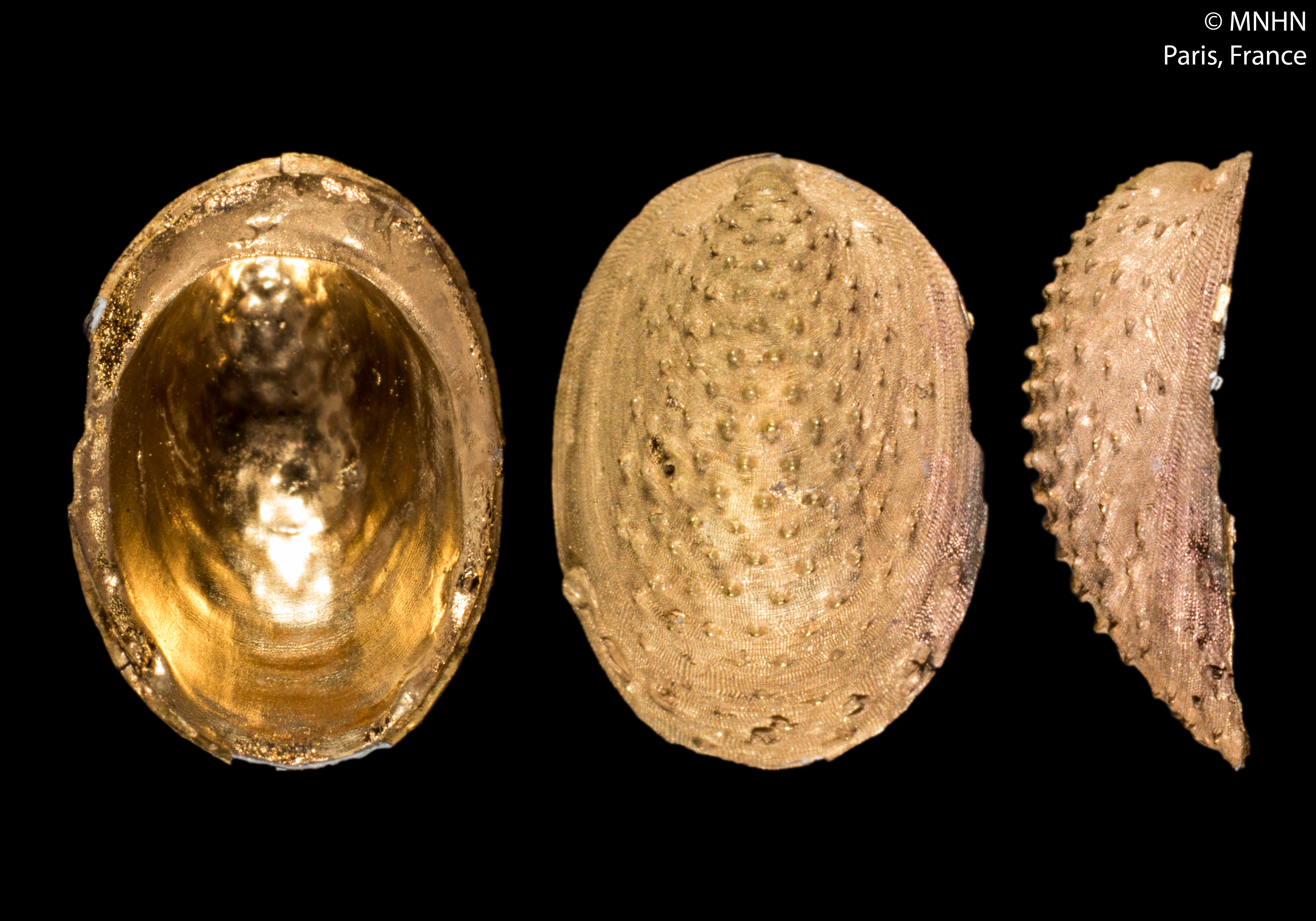
- Nodopelta rigneae

Scientific classification
- Kingdom: Animalia
- Phylum: Mollusca
- Class: Gastropoda
- Subclass: Vetigastropoda
- Superfamily: Neomphaloidea
- Family: Peltospiridae
- Genus: Nodopelta; McLean, 1989

Type species
- Nodopelta heminoda McLean, 1989

= Nodopelta =

Genus of gastropods

Nodopelta is a genus of sea snails, marine gastropod mollusks in the family Peltospiridae.

== Species ==
Species within the genus Nodopelta include:

- Nodopelta heminoda McLean, 1989
- Nodopelta rigneae Warén & Bouchet, 2001
- Nodopelta subnoda McLean, 1989
