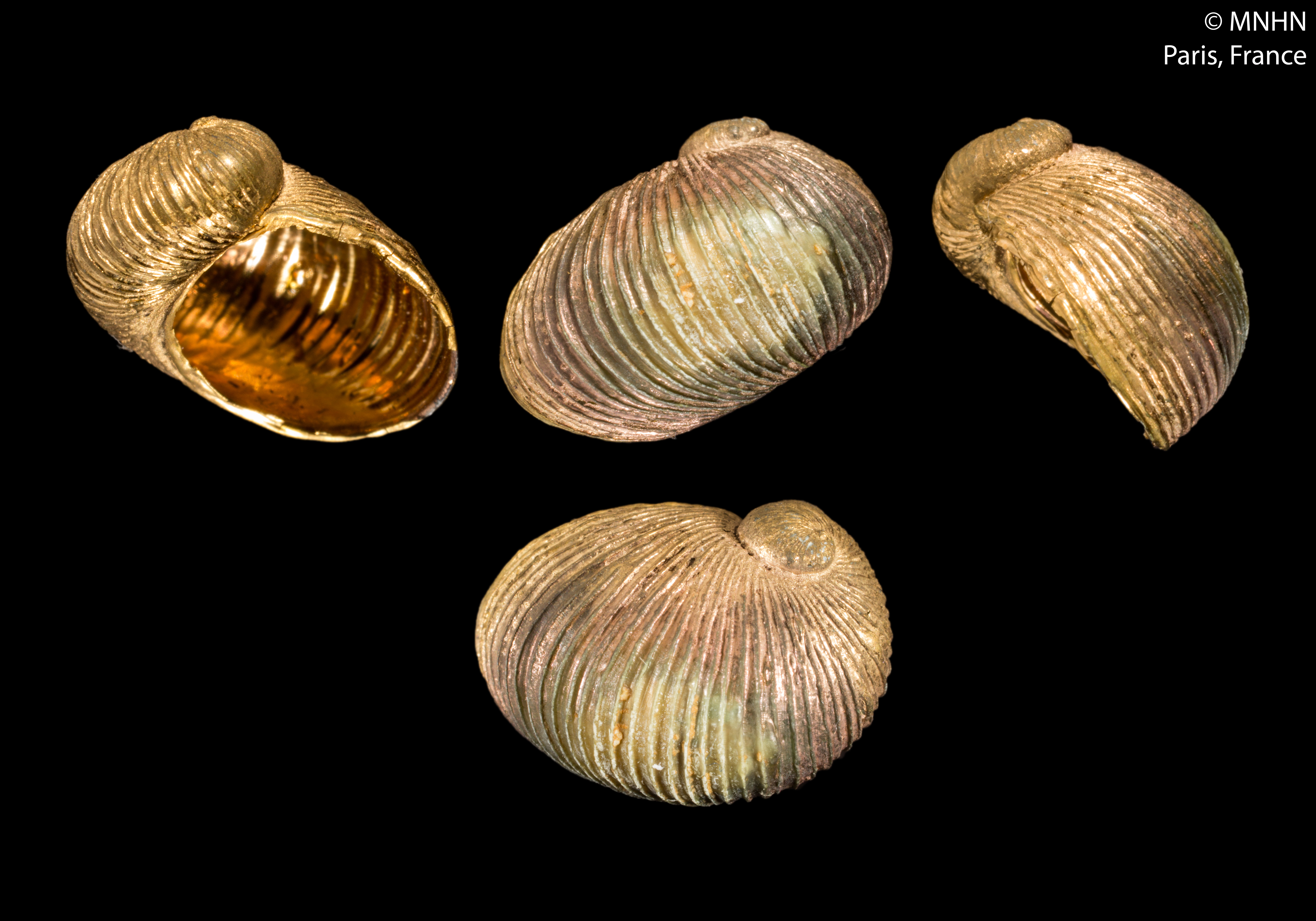
- Peltospira smaragdina

Scientific classification
- Kingdom: Animalia
- Phylum: Mollusca
- Class: Gastropoda
- Subclass: Vetigastropoda
- Family: Peltospiridae
- Genus: Peltospira; McLean, 1989

= Peltospira =

Genus of gastropods

Peltospira is a genus of sea snails, marine gastropod mollusks in the family Peltospiridae.

== Species ==
Species within the genus Peltospira include:

- Peltospira delicata McLean, 1989
- Peltospira gargantua C. Chen, Pradillon, Diaz-Recio & Alfaro-Lucas, 2025
- Peltospira lamellifera Warén & Bouchet, 1989
- Peltospira operculata McLean, 1989
- Peltospira smaragdina Warén & Bouchet, 2001
