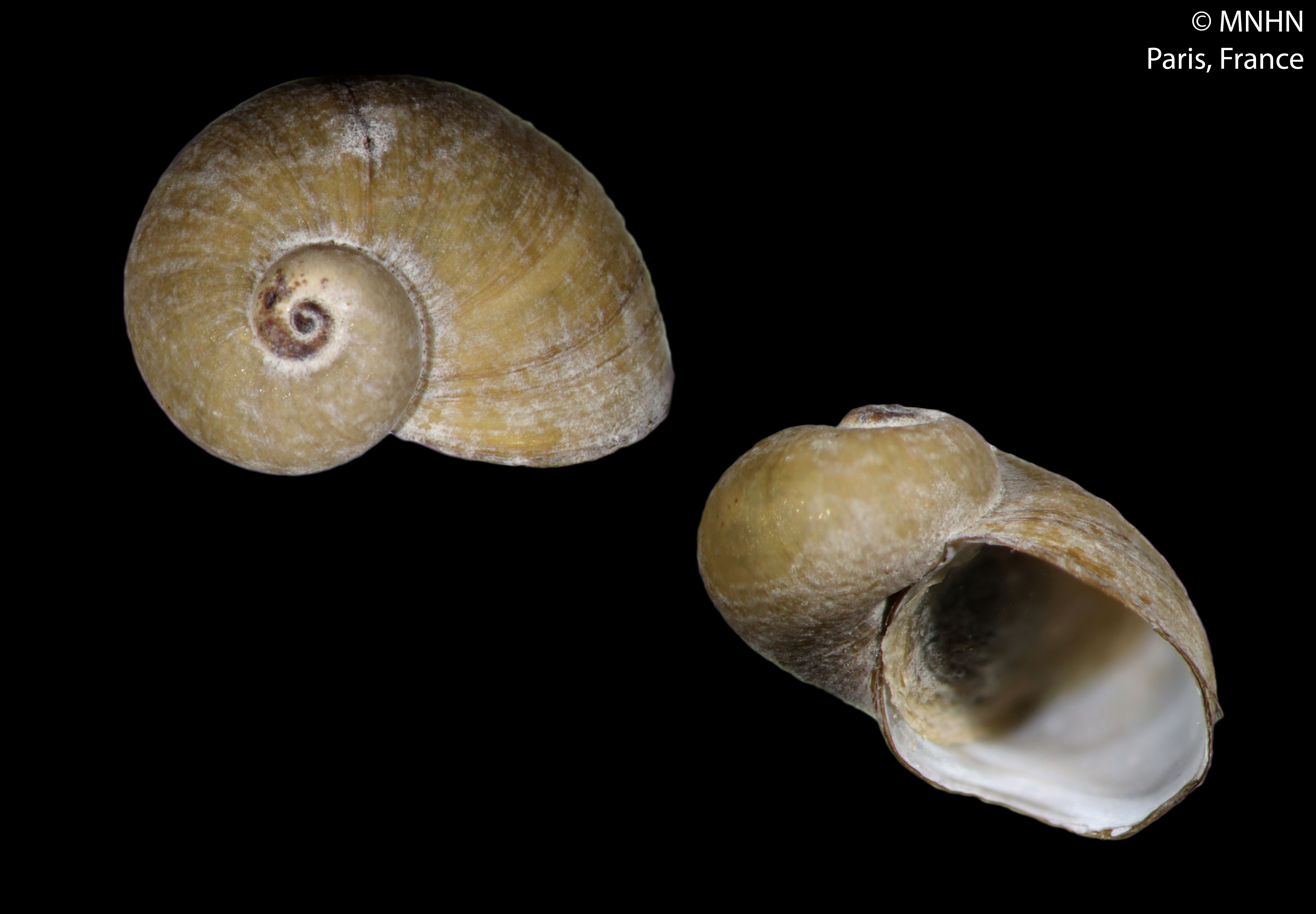

Scientific classification
- Kingdom: Animalia
- Phylum: Mollusca
- Class: Gastropoda
- Subclass: Vetigastropoda
- Family: Peltospiridae
- Genus: Depressigyra
- Species: D. globulus

Binomial name
- Depressigyra globulus Warén & Bouchet, 1989

Synonyms
- Planorbidella globulus Warén & Bouchet, 1989

= Depressigyra globulus =

Species of gastropod

Depressigyra globulus is a species of sea snail and a marine gastropod mollusk in the family Peltospiridae.
