= Planorbidella planispira =

Conservation status
- Near Threatened (IUCN 3.1)

Scientific classification
- Kingdom: Animalia
- Phylum: Mollusca
- Class: Gastropoda
- Subclass: Vetigastropoda
- Family: Neomphalidae
- Genus: Planorbidella
- Species: P. planispira

Binomial name
- Planorbidella planispira (Warén & Bouchet, 1989)

Synonyms
- Depressigyra planispira Warén & Bouchet, 1989

Species of gastropod

Planorbidella planispira is a species of sea snail, a marine gastropod mollusc in the family Neomphalidae.
