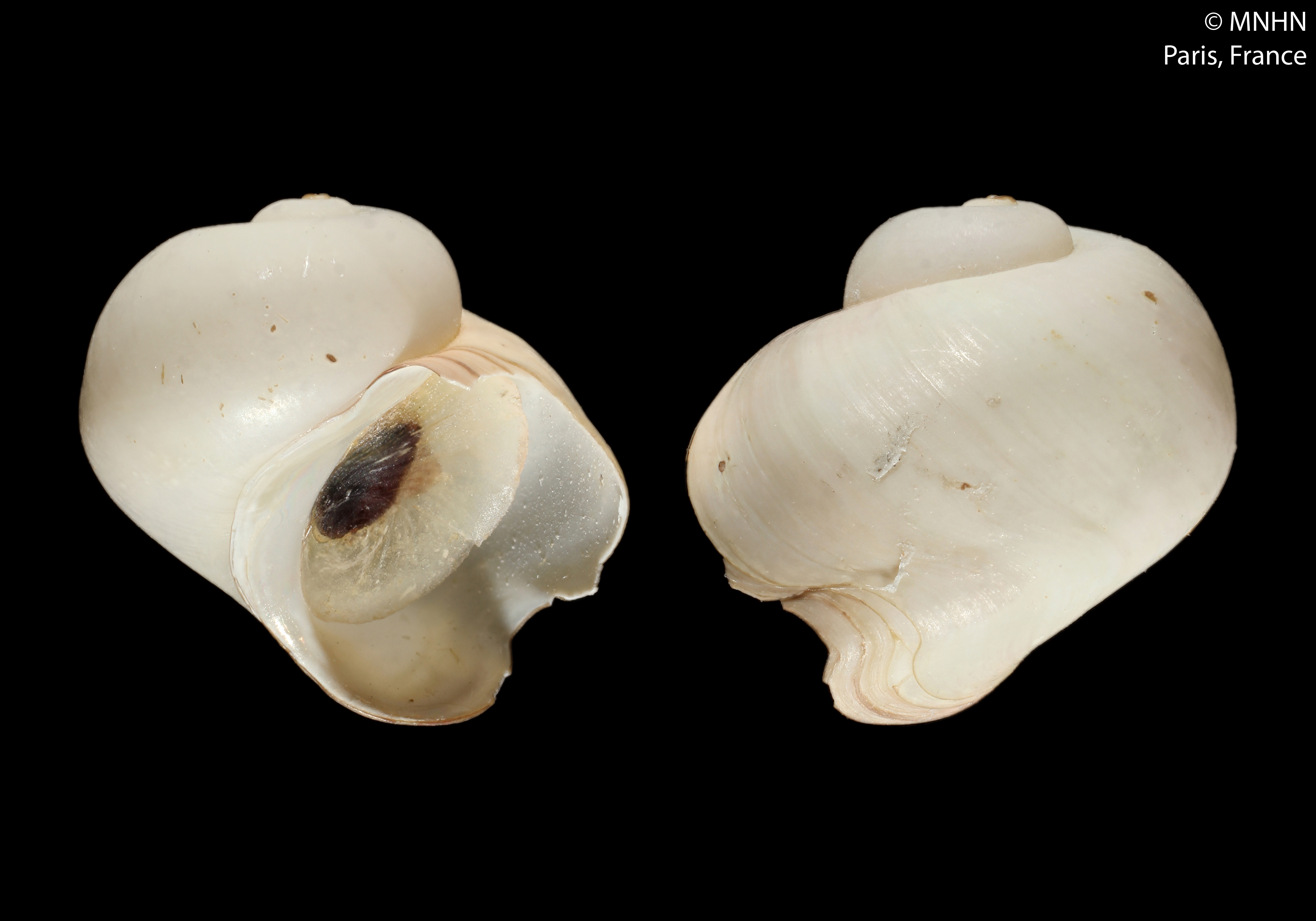
- Shell of Cyathermia naticoides

Scientific classification
- Kingdom: Animalia
- Phylum: Mollusca
- Class: Gastropoda
- Subclass: Vetigastropoda
- Superfamily: Neomphaloidea
- Family: Neomphalidae
- Genus: Cyathermia; Warén & Bouchet, 1989

= Cyathermia =

Genus of gastropods

Cyathermia is a genus of sea snails, marine gastropod mollusks in the family Neomphalidae.

== Species ==
Species within the genus Cyathermia include:

- Cyathermia naticoides Warén & Bouchet, 1989
