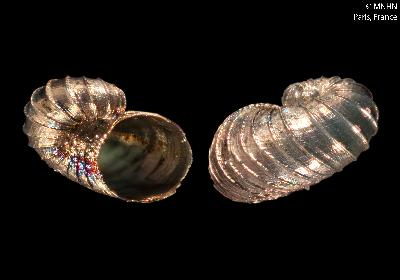
- Planorbidella depressa

Scientific classification
- Kingdom: Animalia
- Phylum: Mollusca
- Class: Gastropoda
- Subclass: Vetigastropoda
- Superfamily: Neomphaloidea
- Family: Neomphalidae
- Genus: Planorbidella; Warén & Bouchet, 1993

Type species
- Depressigyra planispira Warén & Bouchet, 1989

= Planorbidella =

Genus of gastropods

Planorbidella is a genus of sea snails, marine gastropod molluscs in the family Neomphalidae.

== Species ==
Species within the genus Planorbidella include:

- Planorbidella depressa Warén & Bouchet, 1993
- Planorbidella planispira (Warén & Bouchet, 1989)
