= Rhynchopelta =

Scientific classification
- Kingdom: Animalia
- Phylum: Mollusca
- Class: Gastropoda
- Subclass: Vetigastropoda
- Family: Peltospiridae
- Genus: Rhynchopelta; McLean, 1989

Genus of gastropods

Rhynchopelta is a genus of sea snails, marine gastropod mollusks in the family Peltospiridae.

== Species ==
Species within the genus Rhynchopelta include:

- Rhynchopelta concentrica McLean, 1989

Species brought into synonymy

- Rhynchopelta nux Okutani, Fujikura & Sasaki, 1993: synonym of Lepetodrilus nux (Okutani, Fujikura & Sasaki, 1993)
