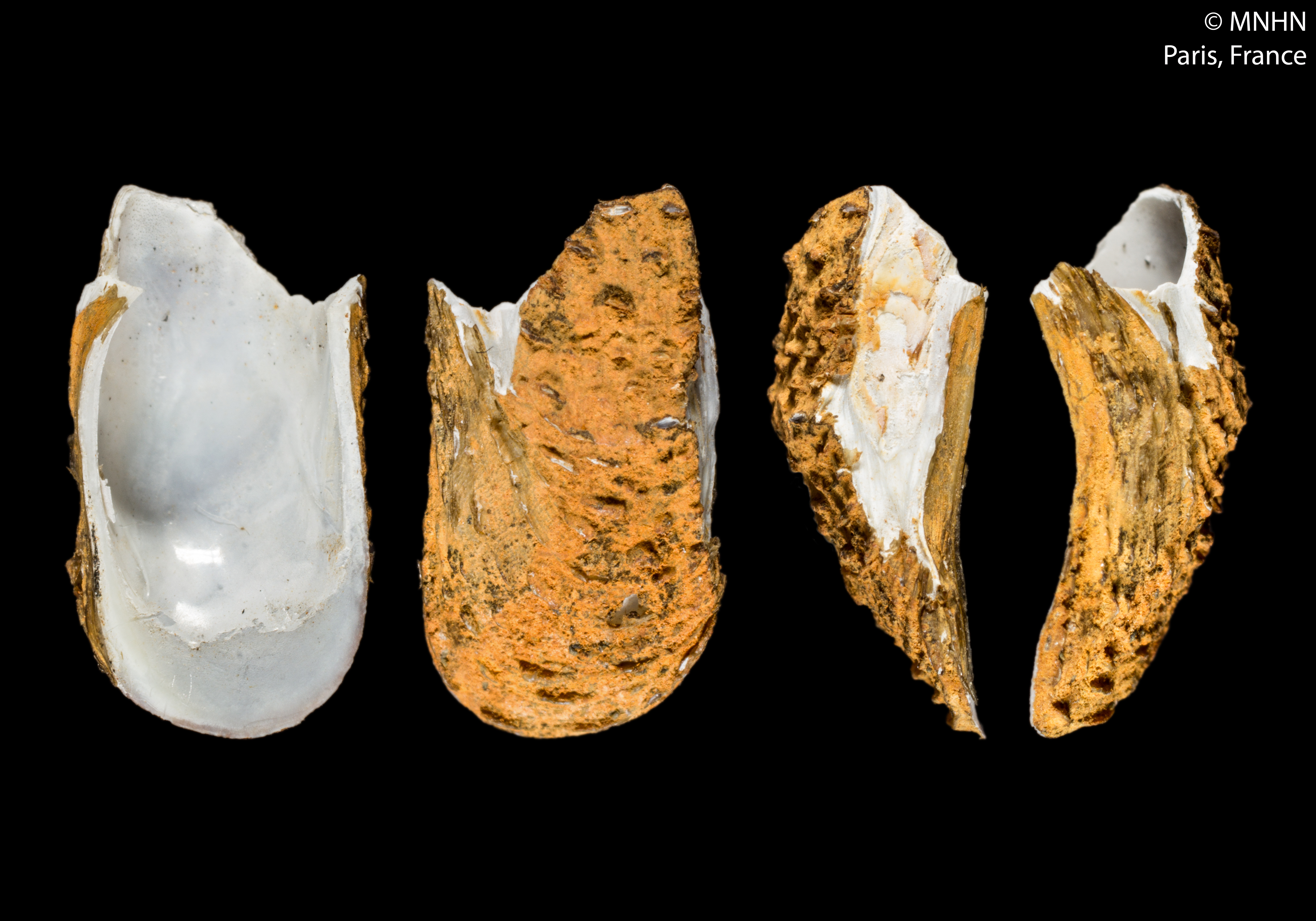
- Shell of Hirtopelta hirta

Scientific classification
- Kingdom: Animalia
- Phylum: Mollusca
- Class: Gastropoda
- Subclass: Vetigastropoda
- Superfamily: Neomphaloidea
- Family: Peltospiridae
- Genus: Hirtopelta; McLean, 1989

Type species
- Hirtopelta hirta McLean, 1989

= Hirtopelta =

Genus of gastropods

Hirtopelta is a genus of sea snails, marine gastropod mollusks in the family Peltospiridae.

== Species ==
Species within the genus Hirtopelta include:

- Hirtopelta hirta McLean, 1989
- Hirtopelta tufari Beck, 2002
