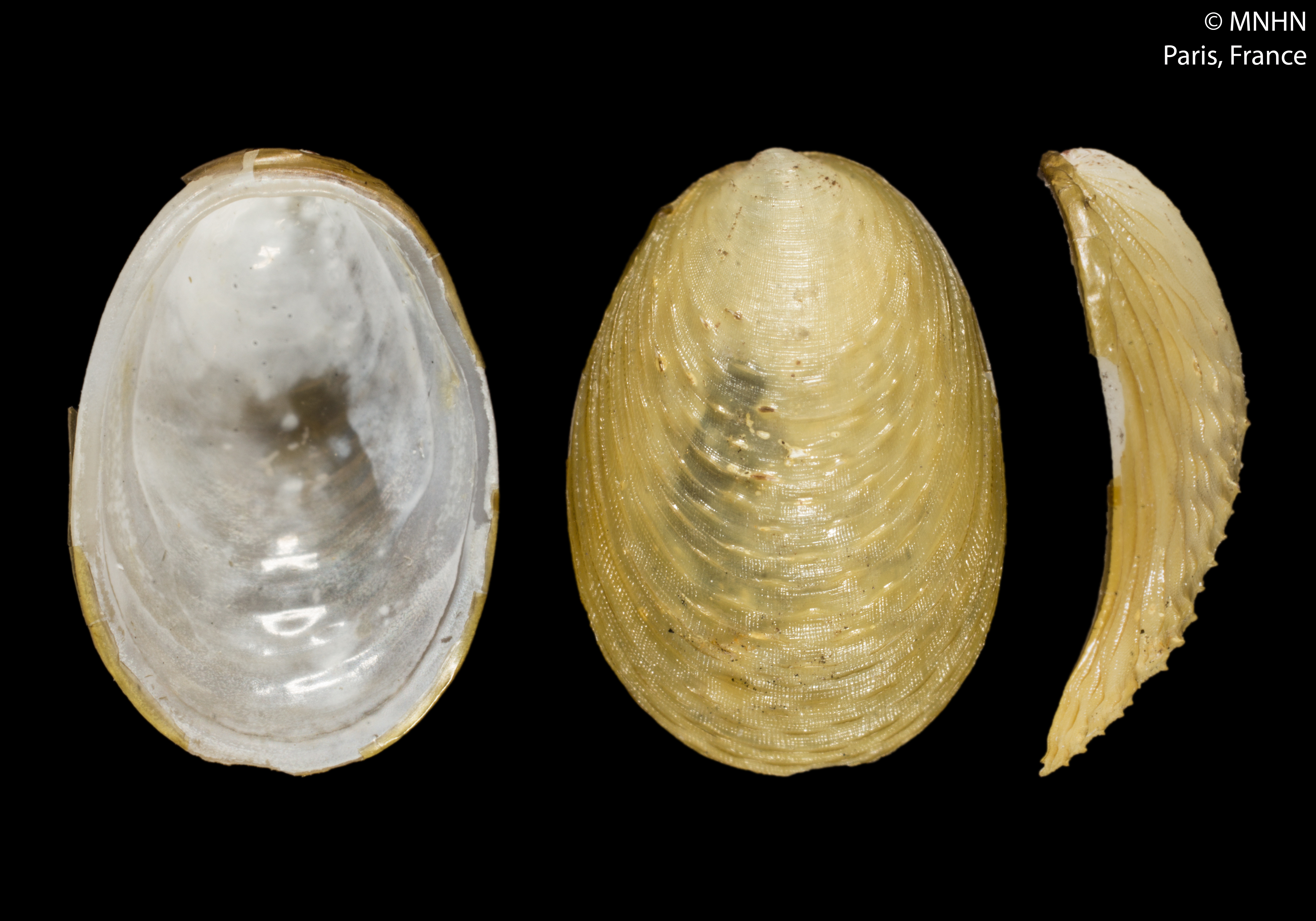
- Shell of Nodopelta subnoda (holotype at MNHN, Paris)

Scientific classification
- Kingdom: Animalia
- Phylum: Mollusca
- Class: Gastropoda
- Subclass: Vetigastropoda
- Family: Peltospiridae
- Genus: Nodopelta
- Species: N. subnoda

Binomial name
- Nodopelta subnoda McLean, 1989

= Nodopelta subnoda =

Species of gastropod

Nodopelta subnoda is a species of sea snail, a marine gastropod mollusc in the family Peltospiridae.

== Distribution ==
This marine species was found on the East Pacific Rise off Mexico.
