= Neomphalus =

Scientific classification
- Kingdom: Animalia
- Phylum: Mollusca
- Class: Gastropoda
- Subclass: Vetigastropoda
- Family: Neomphalidae
- Genus: Neomphalus; McLean, 1981

Genus of gastropods

Neomphalus is a genus of sea snails, marine gastropod mollusks in the family Neomphalidae.

== Species ==
Species within the genus Neomphalus include:

- Neomphalus fretterae McLean, 1981
