= Rhynchopelta concentrica =

Scientific classification
- Kingdom: Animalia
- Phylum: Mollusca
- Class: Gastropoda
- Subclass: Vetigastropoda
- Family: Peltospiridae
- Genus: Rhynchopelta
- Species: R. concentrica

Binomial name
- Rhynchopelta concentrica McLean, 1989

Species of gastropod

Rhynchopelta concentrica is a species of sea snail, a marine gastropod mollusk in the family Peltospiridae.
