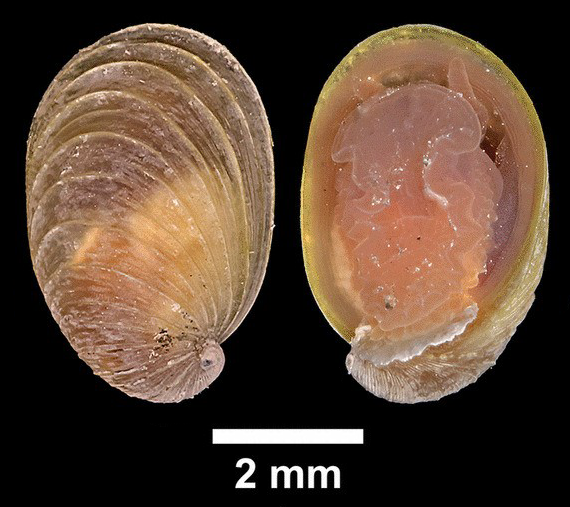

Scientific classification
- Kingdom: Animalia
- Phylum: Mollusca
- Class: Gastropoda
- Subclass: Vetigastropoda
- Family: Peltospiridae
- Genus: Peltospira
- Species: P. operculata

Binomial name
- Peltospira operculata McLean, 1989

= Peltospira operculata =

Species of gastropod

Peltospira operculata is a species of sea snail, a marine gastropod mollusk in the family Peltospiridae.
