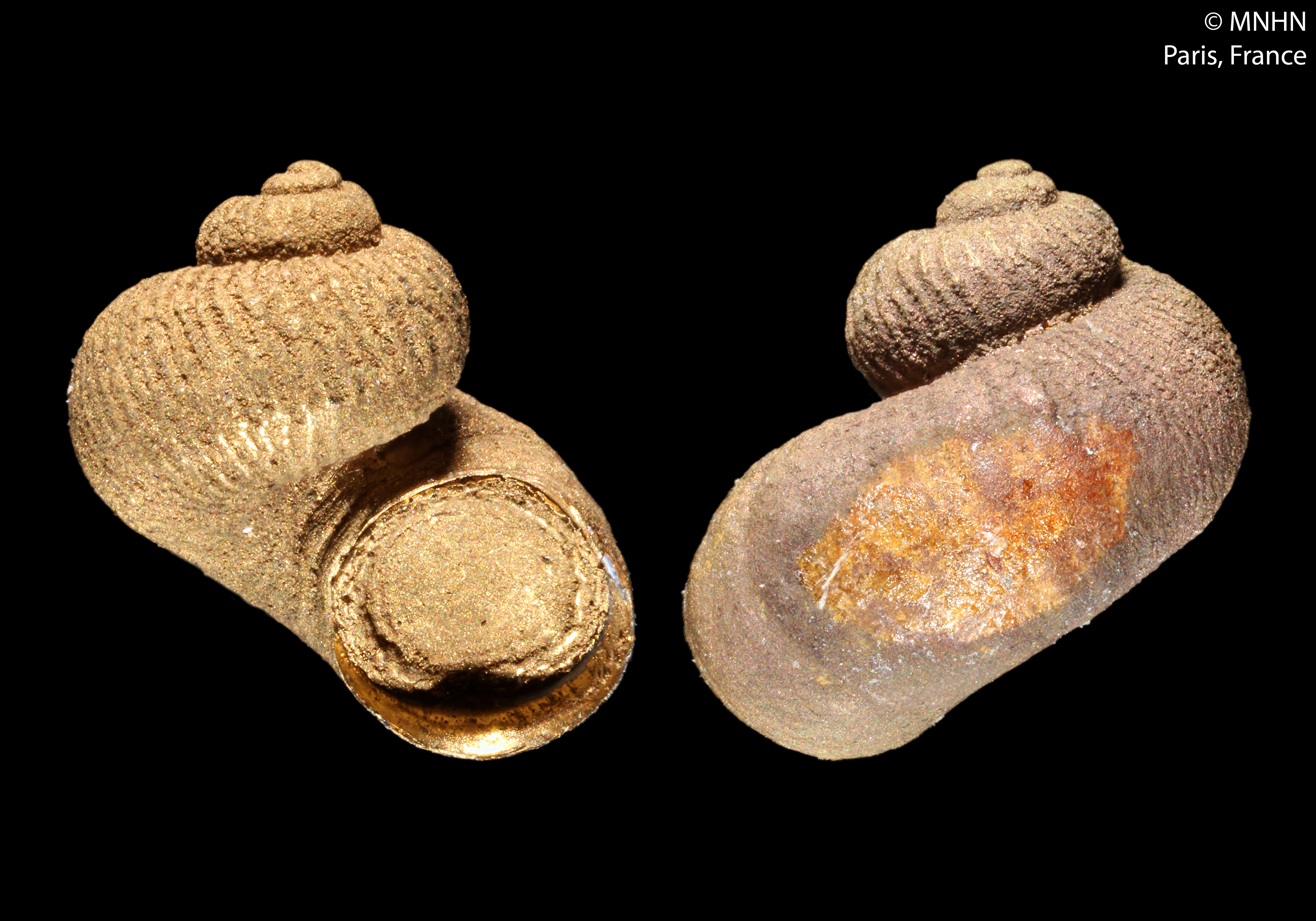
- Shell of Lirapex costellatus (holotype at MNHN, Paris)

Scientific classification
- Kingdom: Animalia
- Phylum: Mollusca
- Class: Gastropoda
- Subclass: Vetigastropoda
- Family: Peltospiridae
- Genus: Lirapex; Warén & Bouchet, 1989

= Lirapex =

Genus of gastropods

Lirapex is a genus of sea snails, marine gastropod mollusks in the family Peltospiridae.

== Species ==
Species within the genus Lirapex include:

- Lirapex costellatus Warén & Bouchet, 2001
- Lirapex granularis Warén & Bouchet, 1989
- Lirapex humatus Warén & Bouchet, 2001
- Lirapex politus Chen, Zhou, Wang & Copley, 2017

Synonyms

- Lirapex costellata Warén & Bouchet, 1989: synonym of Lirapex costellatus Warén & Bouchet, 2001 (wrong grammatical agreement in original description)
- Lirapex humata Warén & Bouchet, 1989 : synonym of Lirapex humatus Warén & Bouchet, 1989 (wrong grammatical agreement in original description)
