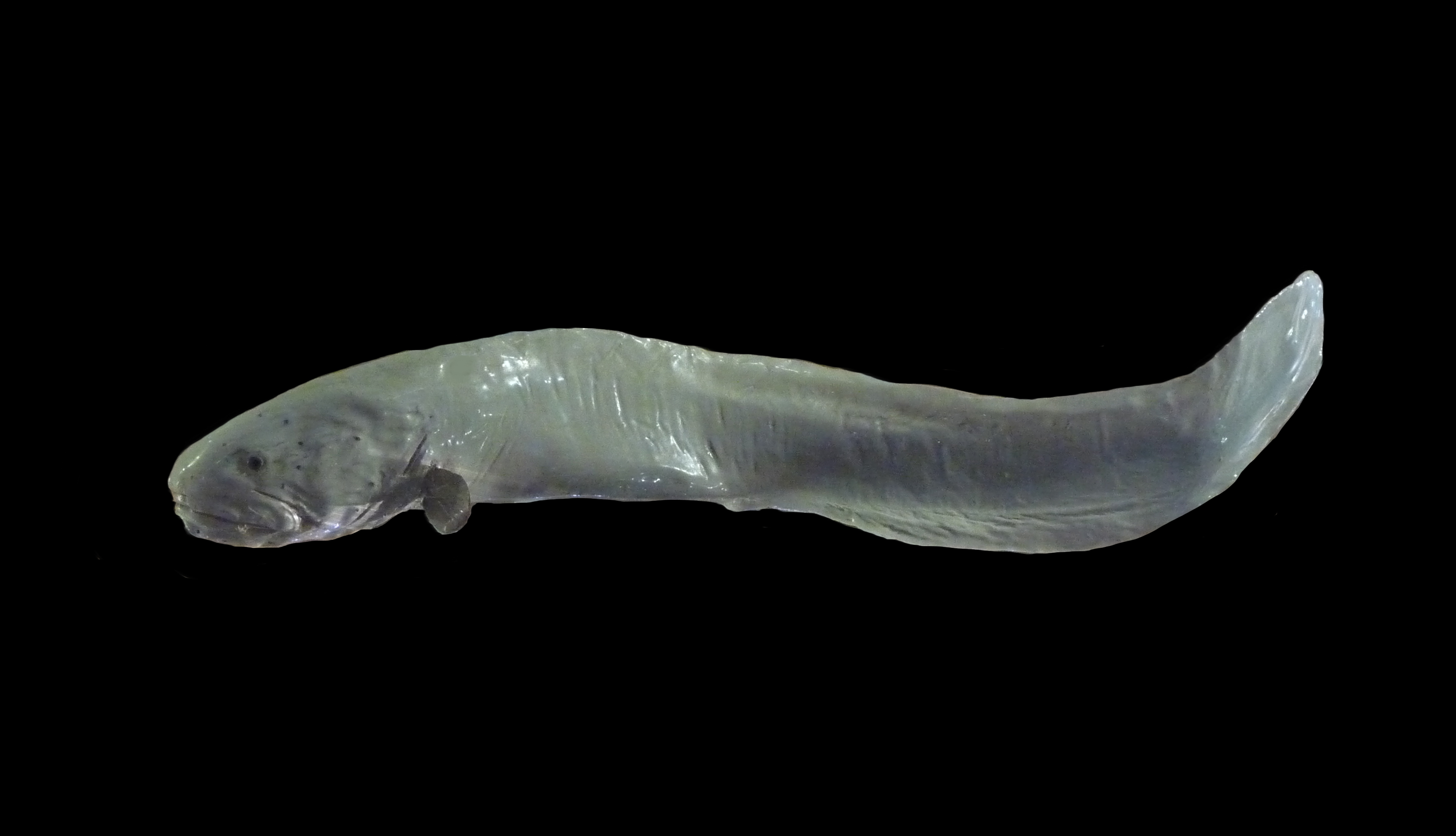
- Thermarces cerberus

Scientific classification
- Kingdom: Animalia
- Phylum: Chordata
- Class: Actinopterygii
- Order: Perciformes
- Family: Zoarcidae
- Subfamily: Lycodinae
- Genus: Thermarces; Rosenblatt & Cohen, 1986

Type species
- Thermarces cerberus Rosenblatt & Cohen, 1986

Species
- see text

= Thermarces =

Genus of fishes

Thermarces is a genus of marine ray-finned fish belonging to the family Zoarcidae, the eelpouts. They are associated with hydrothermal vents and cold seeps at bathypelagic depths in the East Pacific and West Atlantic Ocean.

== Species ==
The following species are classified within the genus Thermarces:

- Thermarces andersoni Rosenblatt & Cohen, 1986
- Thermarces cerberus Rosenblatt & Cohen, 1986
- Thermarces pelophilum Geistdoerfer, 1999
