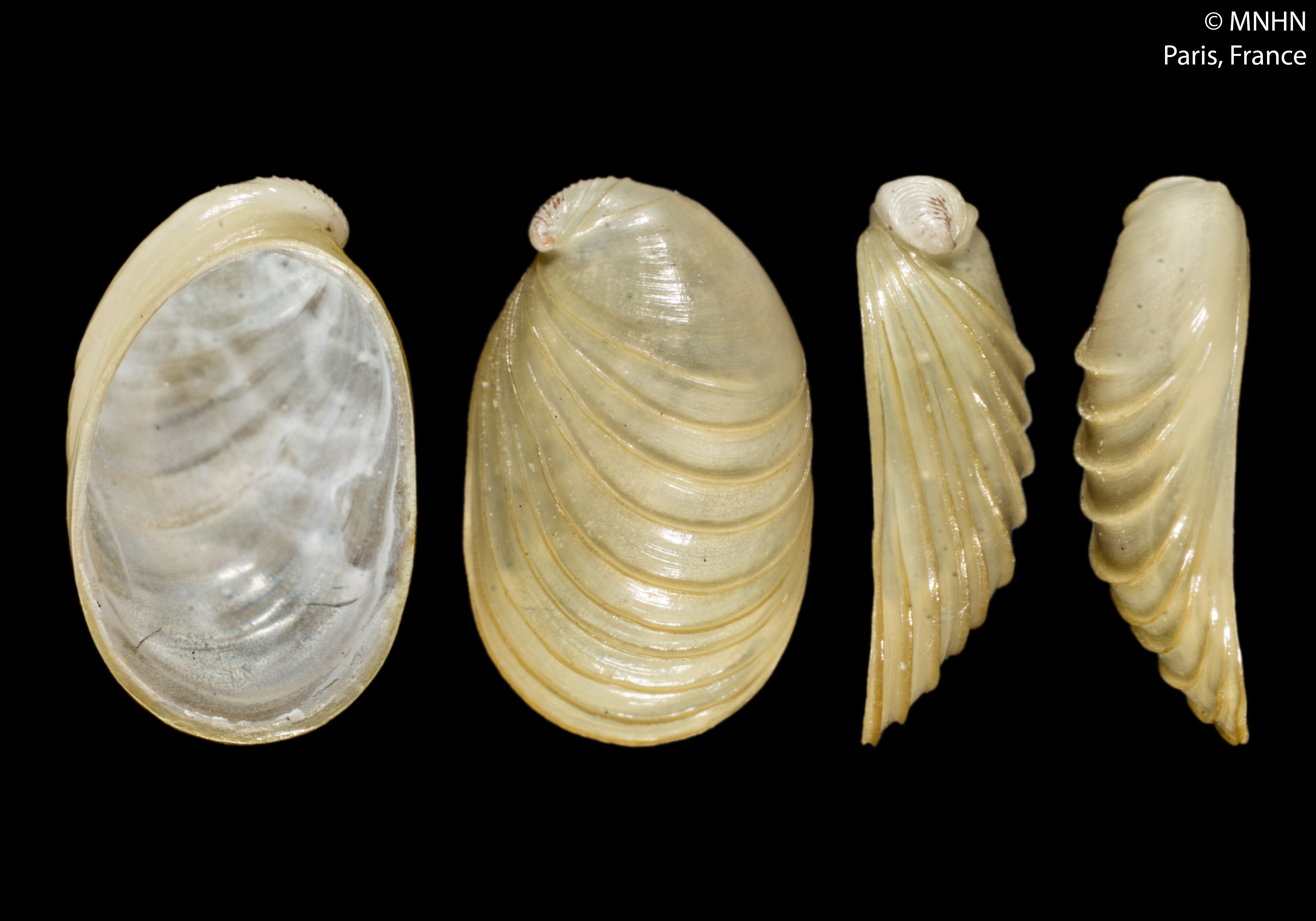
- Shell of Peltospira delicata (paratype at MNHN, Paris)

Scientific classification
- Kingdom: Animalia
- Phylum: Mollusca
- Class: Gastropoda
- Subclass: Vetigastropoda
- Superfamily: Neomphaloidea
- Family: Peltospiridae
- Genus: Peltospira
- Species: P. delicata

Binomial name
- Peltospira delicata McLean, 1989

= Peltospira delicata =

Species of gastropod

Peltospira delicata is a species of sea snail, a marine gastropod mollusk in the family Peltospiridae.

== Distribution ==
This species occurs in the Pacific Ocean off Mexico.
