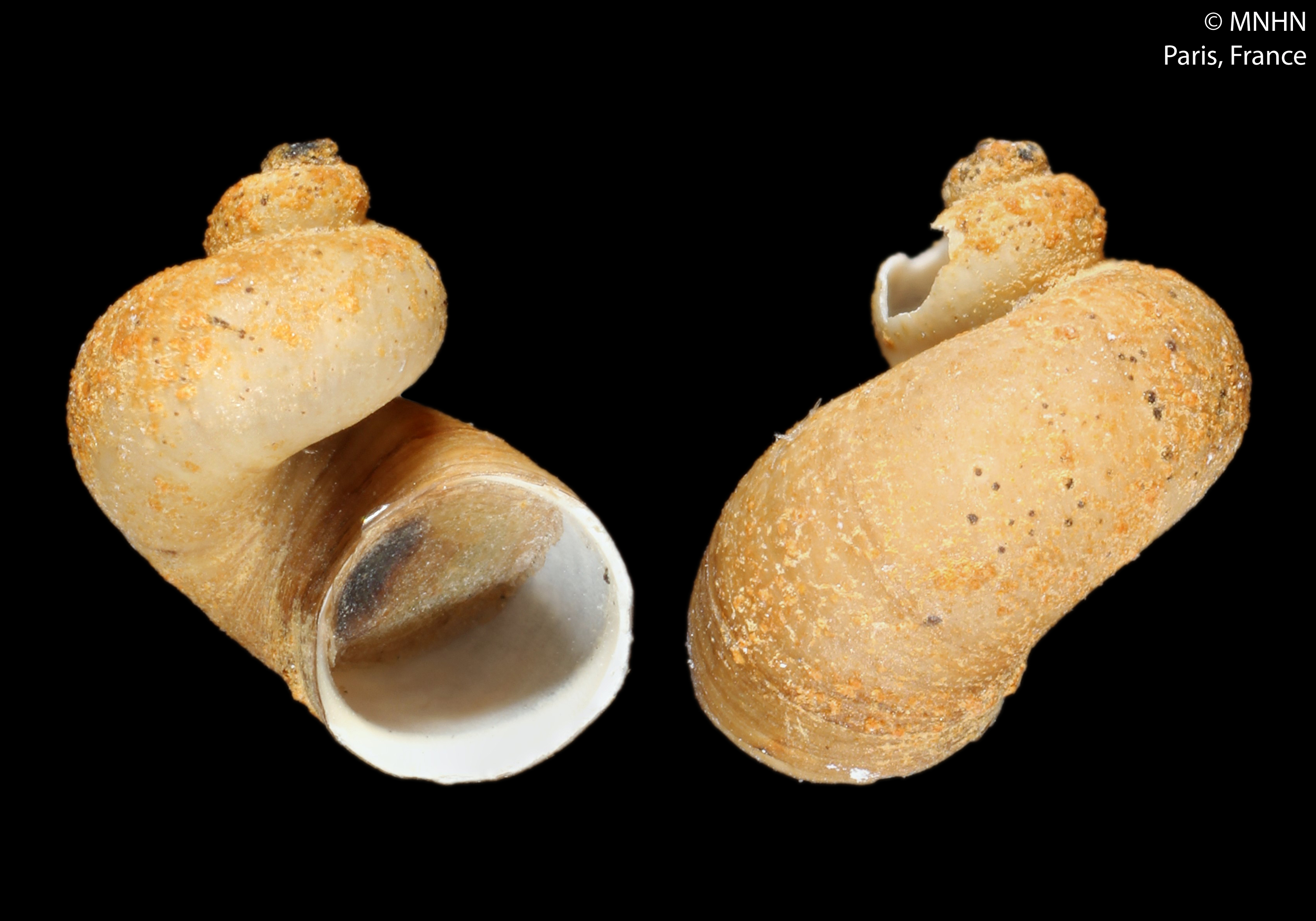
- Shell of Pachydermia laevis

Scientific classification
- Kingdom: Animalia
- Phylum: Mollusca
- Class: Gastropoda
- Subclass: Vetigastropoda
- Superfamily: Neomphaloidea
- Family: Peltospiridae
- Genus: Pachydermia; Warén & Bouchet, 1989

= Pachydermia (gastropod) =

Genus of gastropods

Pachydermia is a genus of sea snails, marine gastropod mollusks in the family Peltospiridae.

== Species ==
Species within the genus Pachydermia include:

- Pachydermia laevis Warén & Bouchet, 1989
- Pachydermia sculpta Warén & Bouchet, 1993
