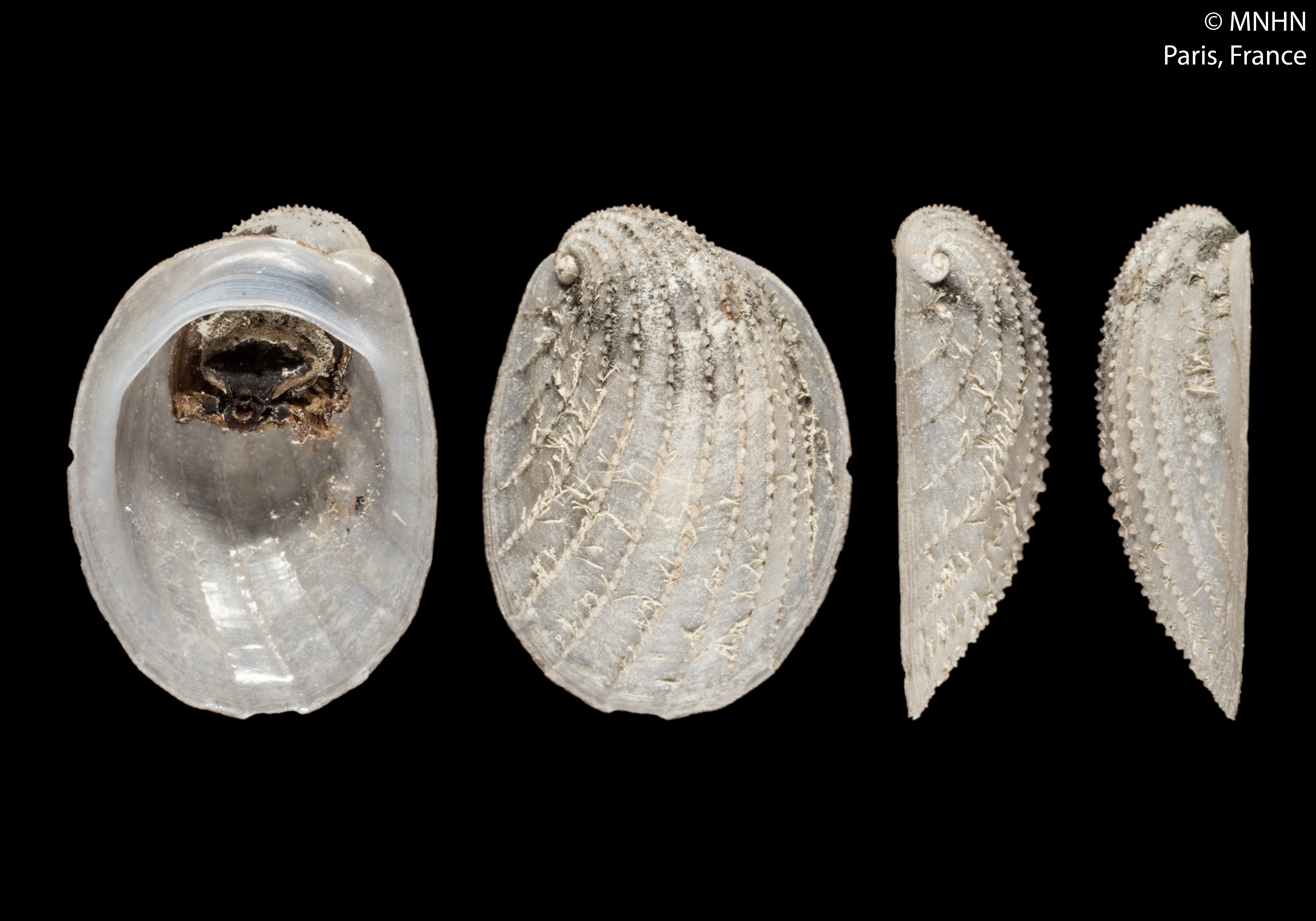
- Shell of Ctenopelta porifera

Scientific classification
- Kingdom: Animalia
- Phylum: Mollusca
- Class: Gastropoda
- Subclass: Vetigastropoda
- Superfamily: Neomphaloidea
- Family: Peltospiridae
- Genus: Ctenopelta; Warén & Bouchet, 1993

Type species
- Ctenopelta porifera Warén & Bouchet, 1993

= Ctenopelta =

Genus of gastropods

Ctenopelta is a genus of sea snails, marine gastropod mollusks in the family Peltospiridae.

== Species ==
Species within the genus Ctenopelta include:

- Ctenopelta porifera Warén & Bouchet, 1993
