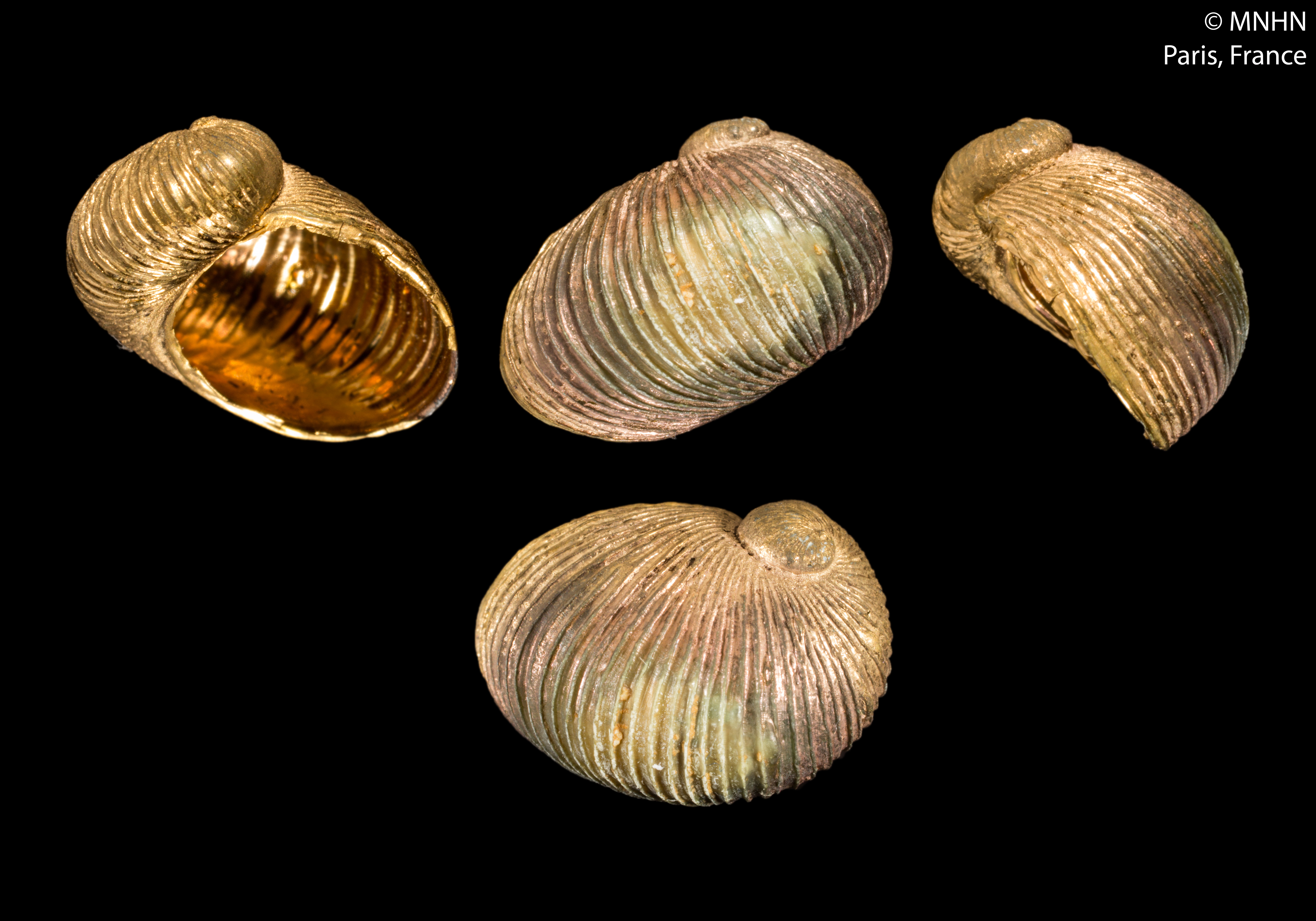
- Shell of Peltospira smaragdina (holotype at MNHN, Paris)

Scientific classification
- Kingdom: Animalia
- Phylum: Mollusca
- Class: Gastropoda
- Subclass: Vetigastropoda
- Family: Peltospiridae
- Genus: Peltospira
- Species: P. smaragdina

Binomial name
- Peltospira smaragdina Warén & Bouchet, 2001

= Peltospira smaragdina =

Species of gastropod

Peltospira smaragdina is a species of sea snail, a marine gastropod mollusk in the family Peltospiridae.

== Distribution ==
This species occurs on the Mid-Atlantic Ridge.

== Description ==
The maximum recorded shell length is 12 mm.

== Habitat ==
Minimum recorded depth is 870 m. Maximum recorded depth is 3520 m.
