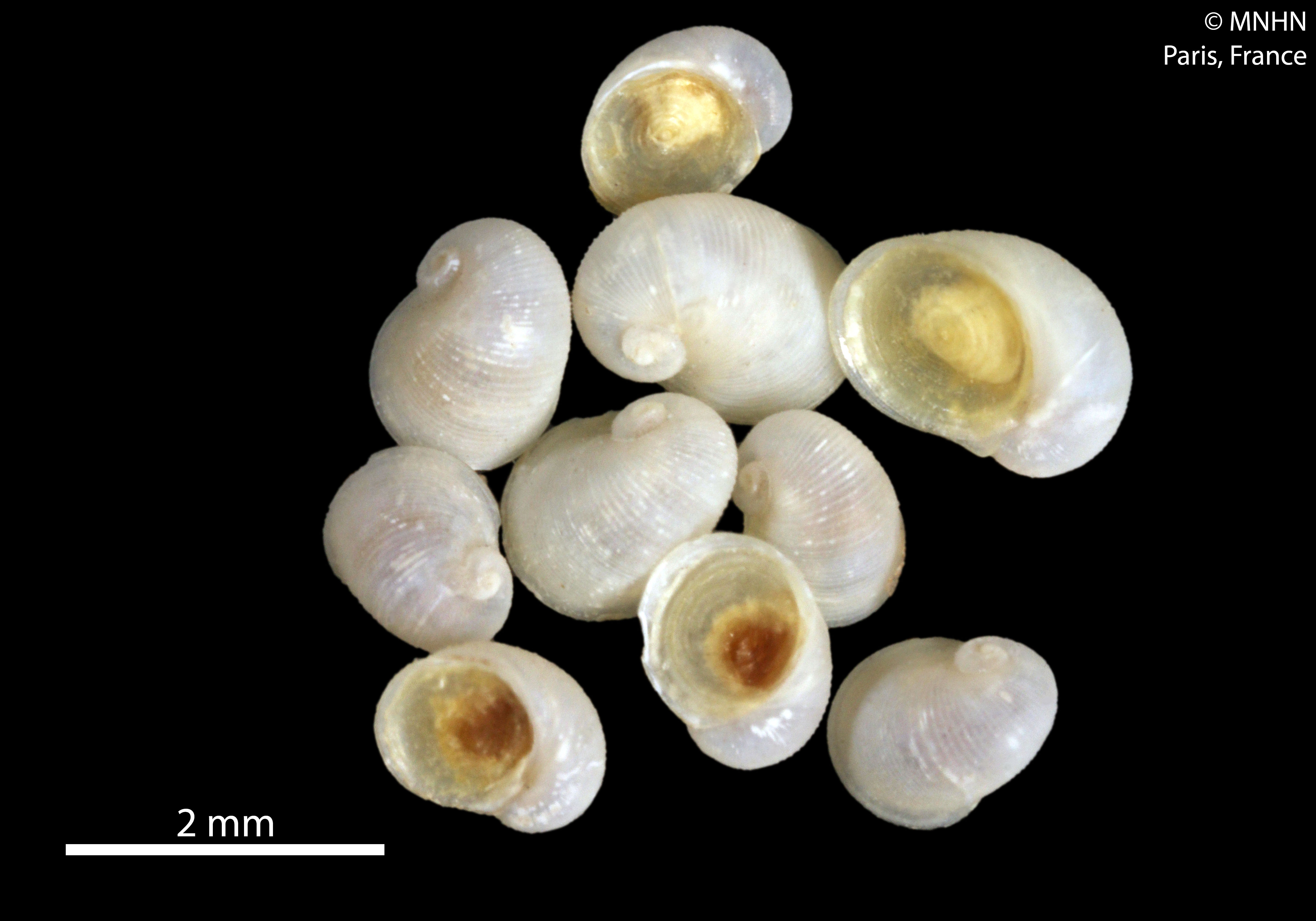
- Shells of Lacunoides exquisitus

Scientific classification
- Kingdom: Animalia
- Phylum: Mollusca
- Class: Gastropoda
- Subclass: Vetigastropoda
- Superfamily: Neomphaloidea
- Family: Neomphalidae
- Genus: Lacunoides; Warén & Bouchet, 1989

= Lacunoides =

Genus of gastropods

Lacunoides is a genus of sea snails, marine gastropod mollusks in the family Neomphalidae.

== Species ==
Species within the genus Lacunoides include:

- Lacunoides exquisitus Warén & Bouchet, 1989
- Lacunoides vitreus Warén & Bouchet, 2001
