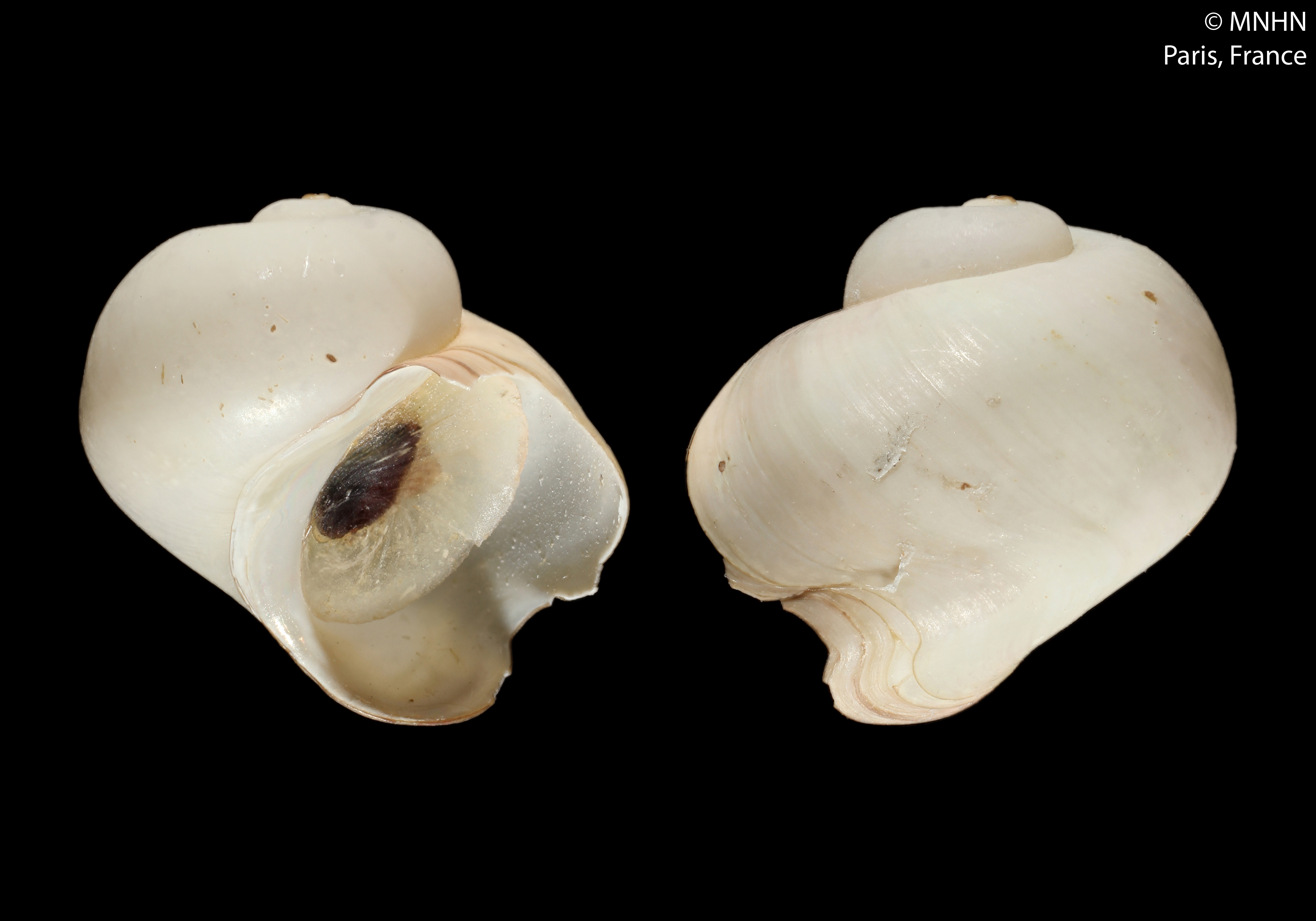
- Shell of Cyathermia naticoides (holotype at MNHN, Paris)

Scientific classification
- Kingdom: Animalia
- Phylum: Mollusca
- Class: Gastropoda
- Subclass: Vetigastropoda
- Family: Neomphalidae
- Genus: Cyathermia
- Species: C. naticoides

Binomial name
- Cyathermia naticoides Warén & Bouchet, 1989

= Cyathermia naticoides =

Species of gastropod

Cyathermia naticoides is a species of sea snail, a marine gastropod mollusk in the family Neomphalidae.

== Description ==
The length of the shell attains 6.6 mm.

== Distribution ==
This marine species was found on the East Pacific Rise.
