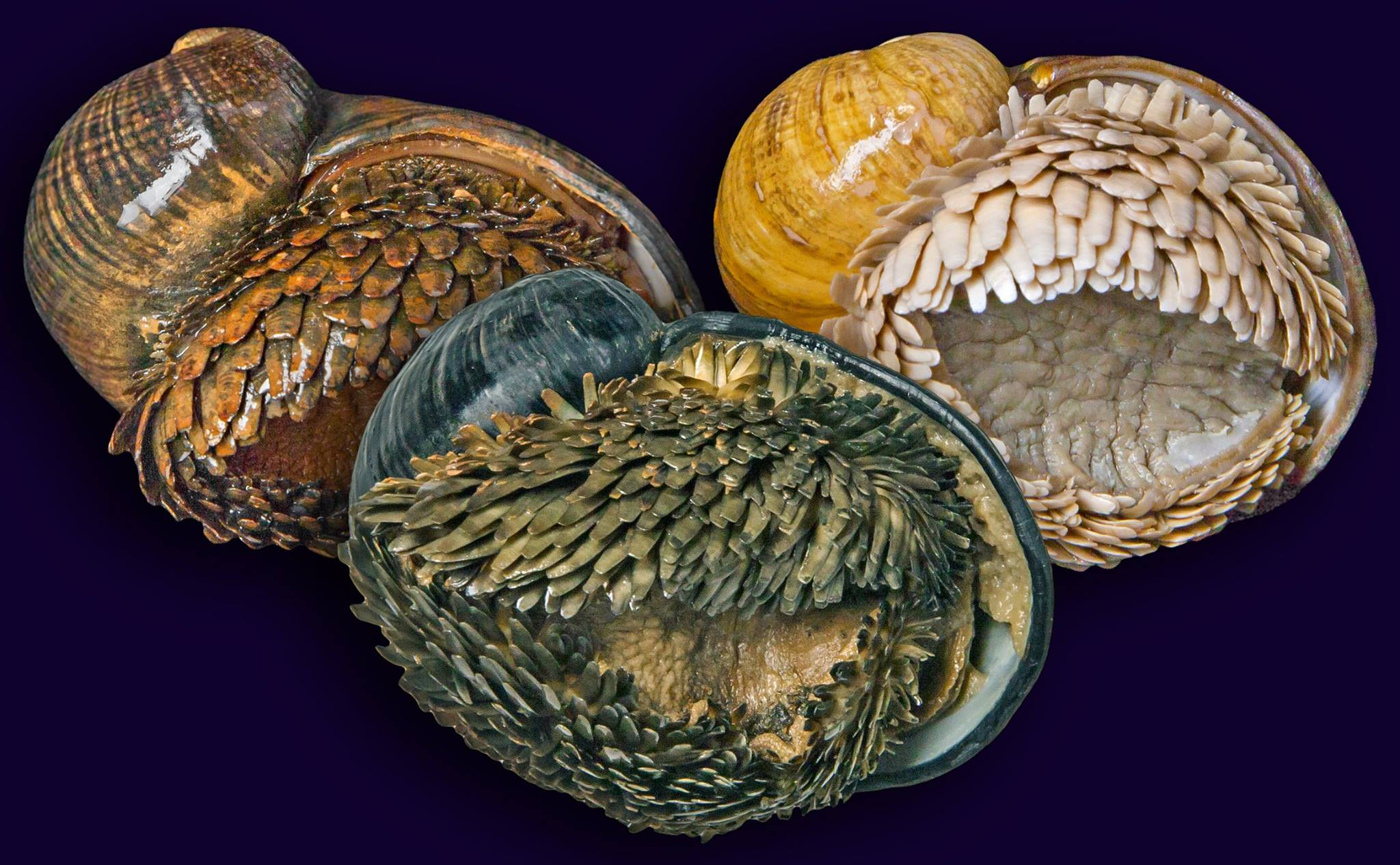
- Chrysomallon squamiferum

Scientific classification
- Kingdom: Animalia
- Phylum: Mollusca
- Class: Gastropoda
- Subclass: Vetigastropoda
- Superfamily: Neomphaloidea
- Family: Peltospiridae; McLean, 1989

Diversity
- 21 extant species

= Peltospiridae =

Family of gastropods

Peltospiridae is a small family of gastropods belonging to the clade Vetigastropoda (according to the taxonomy of the Gastropoda by Bouchet & Rocroi, 2005).

This family has no subfamilies.

== Genera ==
Genera within the family Peltospiridae:

- Chrysomallon (1 species)
- Ctenopelta (1 species)
- Depressigyra Warén & Bouchet, 1989
- Dracogyra C. Chen, Y.-D. Zhou, C.-S. Wang & Copley, 2017
- Echinopelta McLean, 1989
- Gigantopelta C. Chen, Linse, Roterman, Copley & A. D. Rogers, 2015
- Hirtopelta McLean, 1989
- Lirapex Warén & Bouchet, 1989
- Nodopelta McLean, 1989
- Pachydermia Warén & Bouchet, 1989
- Peltospira McLean, 1989
- Rhynchopelta McLean, 1989
- Symmetriapelta L. Beck, 2023

== Cladogram ==
A cladogram based on sequences of cytochrome-c oxidase I (COI) genes showing phylogenic relations of Peltospiridae. Lacunoides and Cyathermia are sometimes classified within Neomphalidae, but according to the COI gene analysis, they cluster within Peltospiridae.

- Peltospiridae
  - - - - Gigantopelta chessoia
        - Gigantopelta aegis
      - - - - Peltospira operculata
            - Peltospira smaragdina
          - Peltospira delicata
        - - Nodopelta subnoda
          - Rhynchopelta concentrica
    - - - Chrysomallon squamiferum
        - Cyathermia naticoides
      - Lacunoides sp. Kermadec
  - Depressigyra globulus
  - Pachydermia laevis
