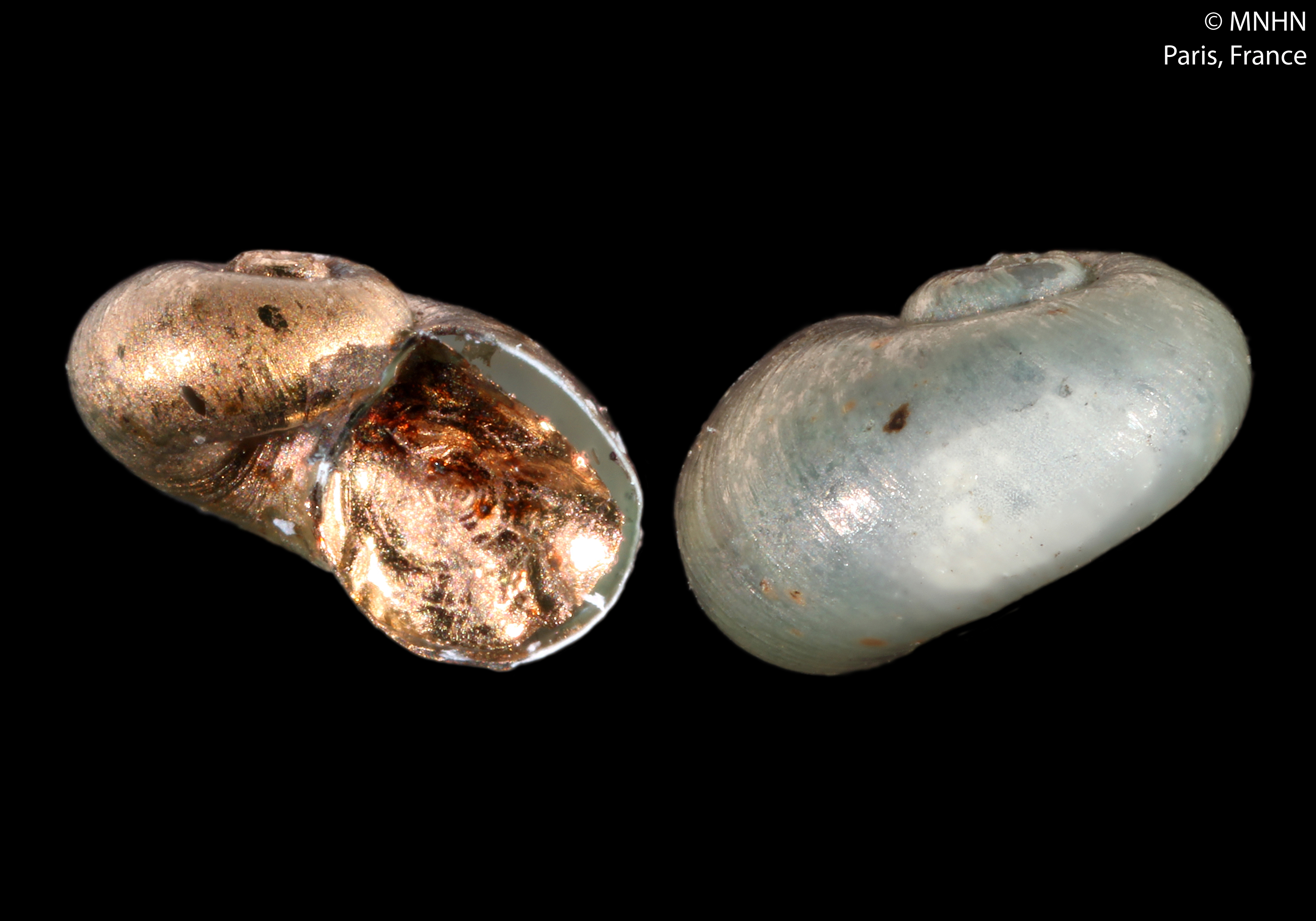
- Shell of Helicrenion reticulatum (paratype at MNHN, Paris)

Scientific classification
- Kingdom: Animalia
- Phylum: Mollusca
- Class: Gastropoda
- Subclass: Vetigastropoda
- Superfamily: Neomphaloidea
- Family: Neomphalidae; McLean, 1981

Diversity
- 10 extant species

Synonyms
- Cyathermiidae McLean, 1990

= Neomphalidae =

Family of gastropods

Neomphalidae is a family of sea snails or limpets, specifically deep sea hydrothermal vent limpets. This family is included in the Vetigastropoda, which is a clade according to the Bouchet & Rocroi, 2005.

No subfamilies are included in this family. The Neomphalidae was removed from the subclass Eogastropoda where it was the only family in the superfamily Neomphaloidea McLean, 1981 and order Neomphalida (McLean, 1981).

== Genera ==
Genera and species within the Neomphalidae include:

- Cyathermia Warén & Bouchet, 1989
- Lacunoides Warén & Bouchet, 1989
- Neomphalus McLean, 1981 - type genus
- Planorbidella Warén & Bouchet, 1993
- Solutigyra Warén & Bouchet, 1989
- Symmetromphalus McLean, 1990
