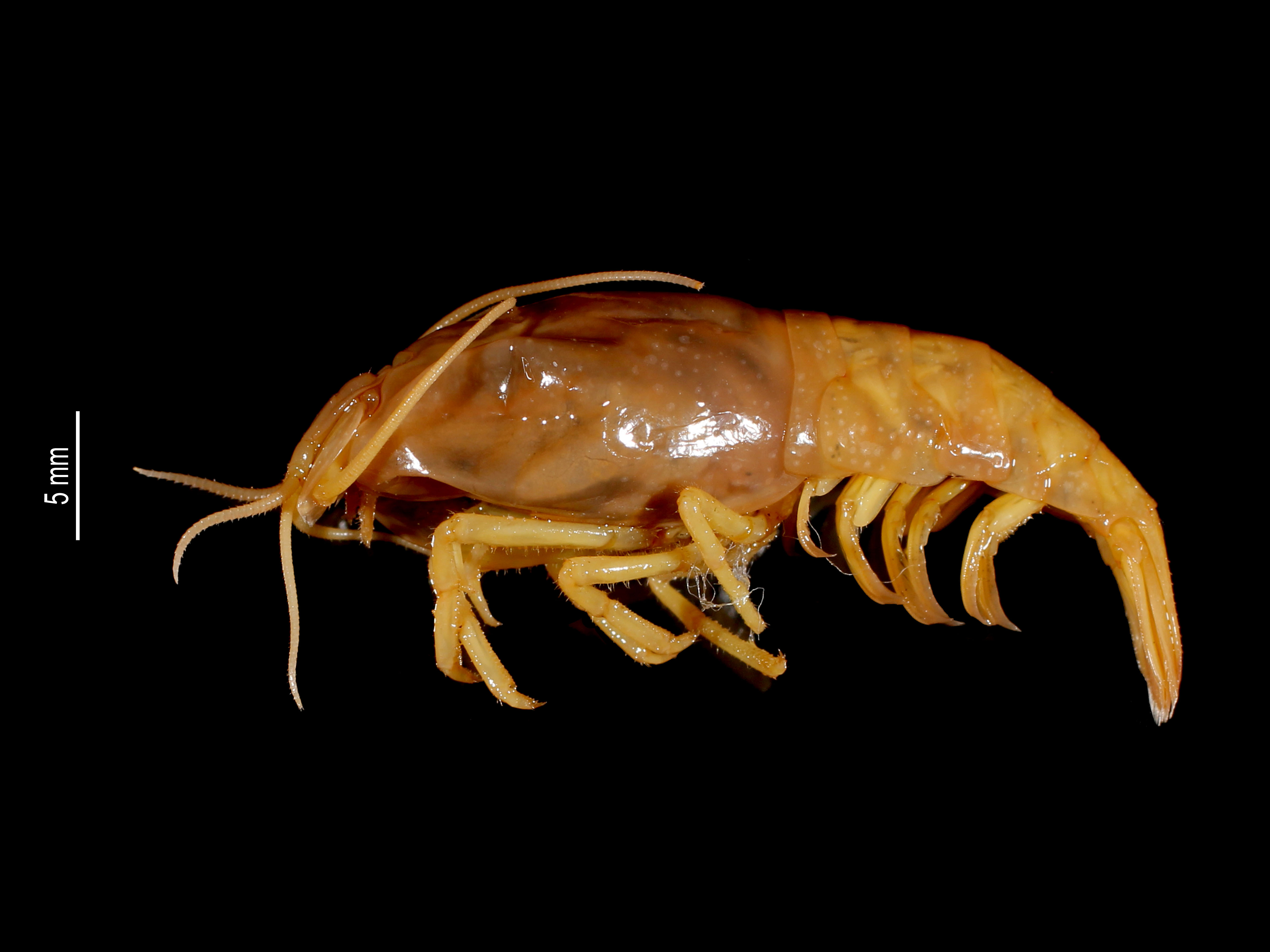

Scientific classification
- Kingdom: Animalia
- Phylum: Arthropoda
- Clade: Pancrustacea
- Class: Malacostraca
- Order: Decapoda
- Suborder: Pleocyemata
- Infraorder: Caridea
- Family: Alvinocarididae
- Genus: Rimicaris
- Species: R. kairei

Binomial name
- Rimicaris kairei Watabe & Hashimoto, 2002

= Rimicaris kairei =

Species of crustacean

Rimicaris kairei is a species of hydrothermal vent shrimp originally discovered in August 2000 by the operators of the ROV Kaiko from the R/V Kairei, being named for both the ship and the Kairei vent field on which they were first discovered. The shrimp have chemosynthetic symbiotic bacteria that live in their guts which gives them energy. Polymorphism is observed, which is based on different concentrations of iron minerals in the environment, which are deposited under the carapace of these shrimp. They are protogynous, and have epipelagic larvae.

== Description ==
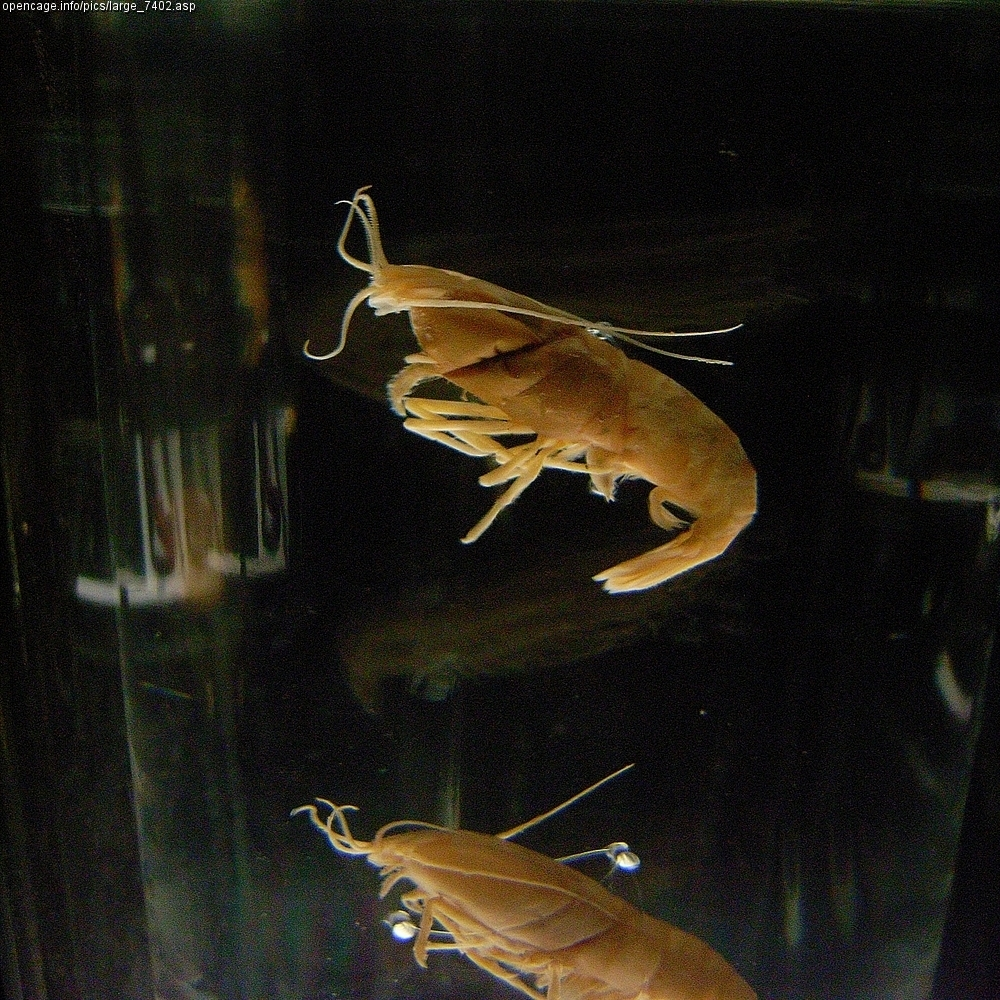
A Rimicaris kairei specimen

Rimicaris kairei have entirely white bodies with blackened branchial chambers possibly from their symbiotic bacteria. Their third to fifth pleopods have brown nails. Rimicaris shrimp range from 4–5 cm (1.6–2.0 in) long and generally weigh an average of 1.6 grams (0.056 oz). They have smaller pereopods than other species in the genus Rimicaris and lack setae that are present in Rimicaris exoculata. Rimicaris kairei also exhibit longer flagellar antennae than their Atlantic counterparts.

Rimicaris kairei have specialized eyes and reduced eyestalks. This eyestalk reduction is an adaptation to the harsh environment of hydrothermal vents. However, even after eyestalk reduction, the peptides that make the eyestalks are retained. These peptides may play a role in the life cycle of the shrimp. The main location of secretion of the peptides is moved from the eyestalks to the brain after such reduction.

Rimicaris kairei shrimps have two distinct color morphs: black and brown, due to differences in mineral deposits within their cephalothorax. The different color morphs do not alter the exterior white coloration of the bodies, such as the carapace itself and the abdominal segments, only the coloration within the cephalothorax. The brown morph has more iron oxides (goethite, ferrihydrite), while the black morph contains more iron sulfides (pyrrhotite) and organic sulfur compounds.

== Distribution ==
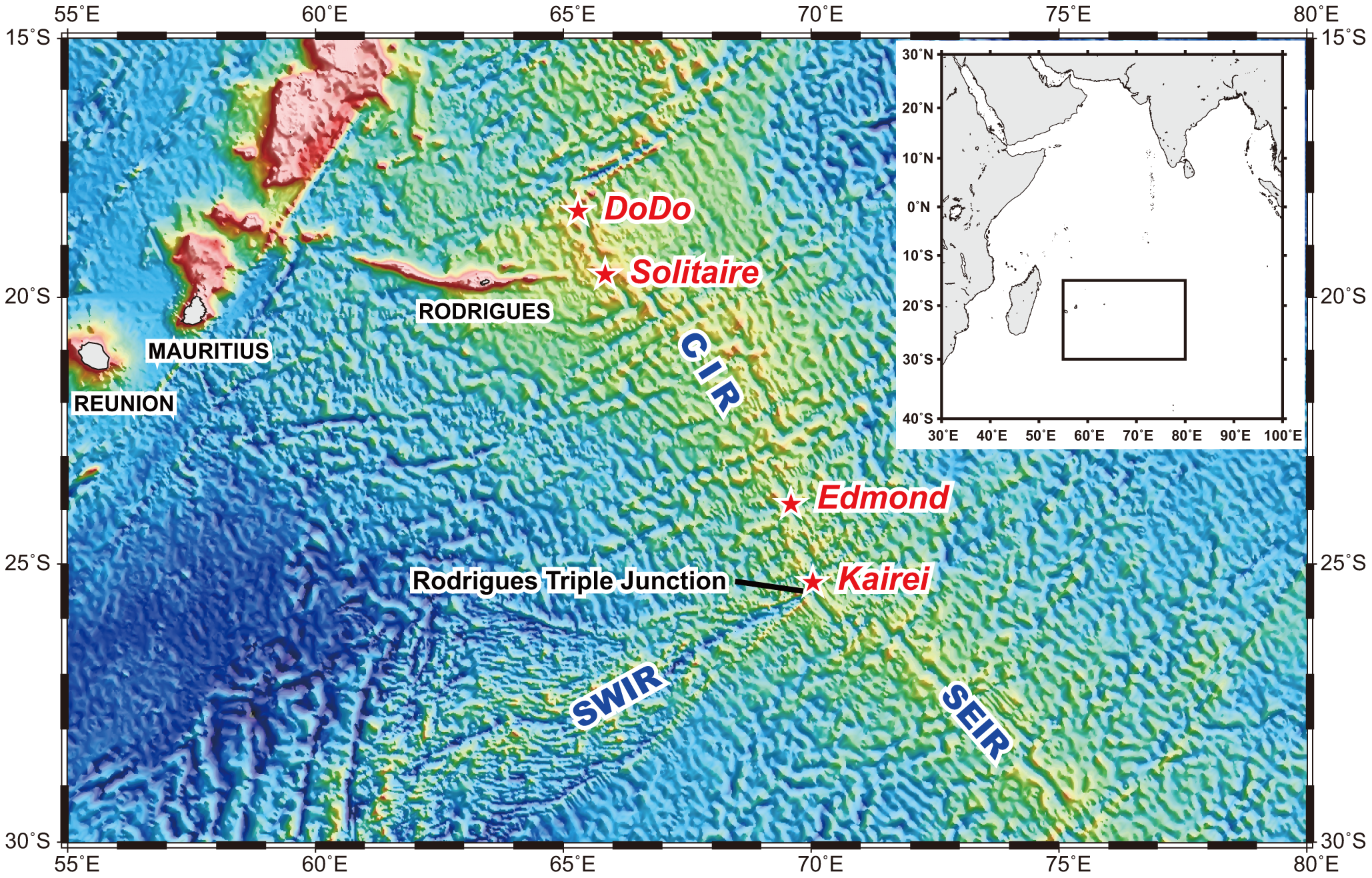
A map of the Central Indian Ridge hydrothermal vents

Rimicaris kairei live on hydrothermal vents in the Dodo, Solitaire, Edmond and Kairei vent fields located in the Indian Ocean along the Central Indian Ridge near the Rodrigues triple junction, and are generally found at depths of 3000 to 3600 meters. Rodrigues triple junction is characterized by active chimneys of the black smoker variety with similar chemical compositions to hydrothermal vents in both the Pacific Ocean and the Atlantic Ocean. The Kairei and Edmond hydrothermal vent sites are characterized by high chlorinities and high concentrations of Iron Sulfide. The Dodo and Solitaire hydrothermal vent sites are much closer to the central Indian Ridge spreading center than the Edmond and Kairei vents and have much different fluid chemical compositions. Rimicaris kairei shrimp are present in high numbers and are often the most populous animal on the Edmond and Kairei vent fields, with their highest populations being seen at the Edmond hydrothermal vent system. These shrimp can often be seen crowding hydrothermal vent openings to get closer to their symbiotes' food source. R. kairei shrimp are less populous on the Dodo and Solitaire vent fields, but they are still the most populous invertebrate found at these sites. Populations of Rimicaris kairei shrimp have been found to be genetically identical in all of these vent fields, with data suggesting that larvae from the Edmond vent sites colonized the other three vent sites. Shrimp in the Rimicaris genus were originally thought to have only lived in the Atlantic ocean before they were first discovered in the Kairei vent fields.

== Biology ==
Rimicaris kairei are found on four different hydrothermal vent sites on the Central Indian Ridge in the Indian Ocean. They are the most populous invertebrate on these vents, being a primary consumer in their ecosystem. They provide an important source of food for Marianactis anemones and Archinome polychaete worms; the former consuming them directly while the latter feeds on their exuviae. In fact, Rimicaris kairei shrimp are the most important part of Marianctis anemone diets, which make up the second most populous species on the Kairei vents and most populous secondary consumer. Additionally, scientists have observed a giant anemone of the species Relicanthus daphneae catching one of these shrimp alive with its large tentacles that contain spirocysts.

=== Energy ===
Rimicaris kairei have symbiotic bacteria that undergo chemosynthesis. One study found that there were 340 different species of symbiotic bacteria found in Rimicaris kairei individuals, but only 34 that made up more than 1% of the overall bacterial population. These symbiotic bacteria live in their intestines and manufacture energy by reducing sulfur from hydrothermal vents. Adult Rimicaris kairei get their nutrition from their symbiotes through a direct transfer taking place on the cephalothorax. The most abundant bacteria pathways for adults are for sulfur, carbohydrates, and biotin metabolism. In contrast to adults, larval Rimicaris shrimp feed on photosynthetic organisms in the euphotic zone. Juvenile Rimicaris's bacteria pathways are related to ansamycin synthesis, branched-chain amino acid biosynthesis, lipid metabolism, and cell motility. Rimicaris kairei shrimp will crowd as close to the hydrothermal vents as possible to get more food for their chemosynthetic bacteria.

Gut microbiomes are different based on developmental stage as the shrimp have different needs at different times. Adult individuals have richer, more diverse populations of symbiotic bacteria which would allow them to better survive in their harsh environments. The most abundant microbiome phylum in adults is Campilobacterota while the most abundant microbiome phylum in juveniles is Deferribacterota. The main bacteria contributing to this difference are defferibacteraceae and Sulfurovum. Unlike in R. exoculata, where different bacterial communities drive these differences, R. kairei hosts the same symbiotic bacteria, which alter their metabolism based on vent chemistry. This metabolic flexibility allows the shrimp to adapt to varying hydrogen and sulfide concentrations in different hydrothermal vent environments.

=== Reproduction ===
Rimicaris shrimp are protogynous and reproduce sexually through internal fertilization. Rimicaris kairei shrimp reproduce during the austral summer, during the same time period as their Atlantic congeneric Rimicaris exoculata. R. Kairei have lower fecundities than other shrimp in the Alvinocarididae family, and their egg sizes are larger than other species in the Alvinocarididae family. This displays the tradeoff of using more energy to produce larger eggs while producing less offspring. Rimicaris kairei shrimp undergo a larval stage where they consume dead photosynthetic organisms that fall through the water column. This larval stage can be elongated and allows them to stray up to 100 meters from a hydrothermal vent. This can explain how they are found in multiple different hydrothermal vent sites along the Central Indian Ridge.
