= M. indica =

M. indica may refer to:

- Macrochlamys indica, an air-breathing land snail species
- Makaira indica, the black marlin, a fish species found in tropical and subtropical Indo-Pacific oceans
- Mangifera indica, the mango, a tree species
- Melicope indica, a plant species endemic to India
- Mirocaris indica, a crustacean species
- Moschiola indica, the Indian spotted chevrotain, an even-toed ungulate species found in India

== Synonyms ==
- Madhuca indica, a synonym for Madhuca longifolia, a tropical tree species found in India
- Masoniella indica, a synonym for Acrophialophora fusispora, a fungal pathogen species
- Melilotus indica, a synonym for Melilotus indicus, a yellow-flowered herb species native to northern Africa, Europe and Asia

== See also ==
- Indica (disambiguation)
