= CrustaStun =

Device to administer a lethal electric shock to shellfish before cooking

The CrustaStun is a device designed to administer a lethal electric shock to shellfish (such as lobsters, crabs, and crayfish) before cooking. This is marketed as a more humane alternative to boiling a live shellfish. The CrustaStun design consists of a stainless-steel box approximately the size of a domestic microwave oven containing a tray with a wet sponge and an electrode. The shellfish is placed in the box and, upon the lid's closure, the wet sponge conducts the current which electrocutes the animal with a 120 volt, 2–5 ampere current. It is claimed that the CrustaStun renders the shellfish unconscious in 0.3 seconds and kills the animal in 5 to 10 seconds, compared to claims that it takes 3 minutes to kill a lobster via boiling and 4.5 minutes for a crab. However, the source for the claim that it takes a crab several minutes to die from boiling states that death actually occurs in about 10 seconds. Movements detected after this period were attributed to heat's effect on the muscles or escape of air from the branchial chambers, not voluntary movements.

The inventor, Simon Buckhaven, spent two years developing the device with scientists from the University of Bristol. The device was manufactured in England at an estimated cost of £2,500 in 2009

== See also ==
- Pain in crustaceans
