= Kairei vent field =

Hydrothermal vent field in the Indian Ocean

- A series of vents at the Rodrigues triple junction
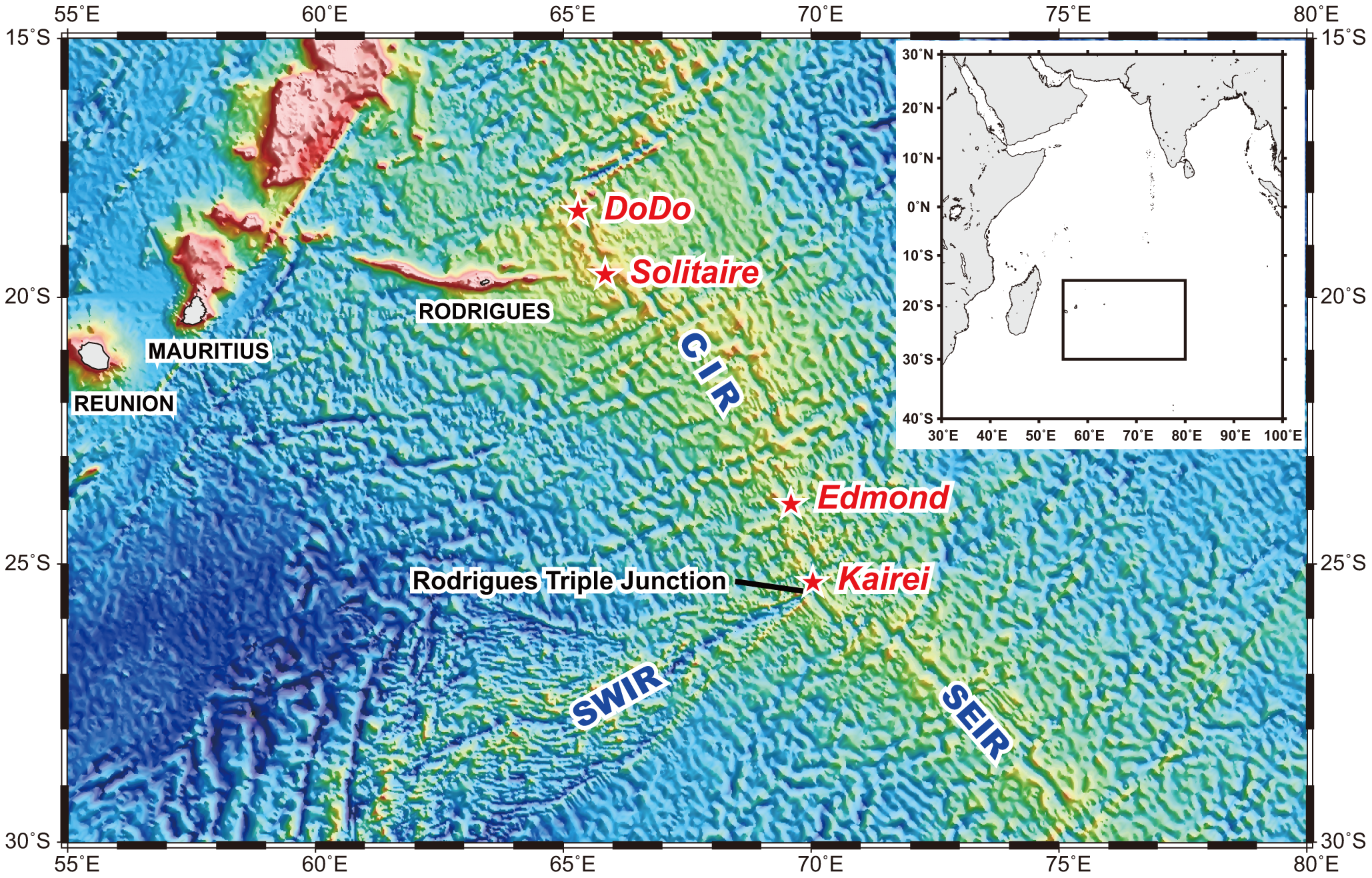
- Map of the Rodrigues triple junction

- Location within Earth
- Location: Indian Ocean
- Coordinates: 25°19′10″S 70°02′24″E
- Area: 40–100 square metres (430–1,080 sq ft)
- Max. elevation: −2,460 metres (−8,070 ft)

The Kairei vent field is a hydrothermal vent field located in the Indian Ocean at a depth of 2,460 metres (8,070 ft). It is just north of the Rodrigues triple junction, approximately 2,200 kilometres (1,400 mi) east from Madagascar. It is the first hydrothermal field discovered in the Indian Ocean and the first of the series of known vents along the Central Indian Ridge.

== History ==
The vent field was discovered in 2000 by the R/V Kairei and ROV Kaikō operated by Japan Marine Science and Technology Center (JAMSTEC). In 2001, the site was surveyed with high resolution prior to the deployment of ROV JASON.

The vent field was visited again by JAMSTEC in 2009 on the YK09-13 cruise, where the HOV Shinkai6500 was deployed.

== Geology ==
The field is dominated by sulfide talus, with the approximate area of high-temperature venting constrained to approximately 40 square meters. Fluids from the vent field have been measured in excess of 360 °C (680 °F) and are rich in metals, providing a black-smoker appearance. Elevated chlorinity in venting fluids suggests that phase-separation happens deep below the field.

== Biology ==
The Kairei vent field is one of the few known locations of the Sea Pangolin, threatened by deep sea mining. It is also a site associated with Gigantopelta aegis and Alviniconcha strummeri gastropods.

It is the site of discovery of Rimicaris kairei, belonging to the family of hydrothermal shrimp found at many sites in the Atlantic Ocean.

Carbon and nitrogen isotopes suggest that there are four distinct trophic levels at the Karei vent field.

Kairei is also of concern with respect to research on deep sea dispersal pathways, with some shared biological communities to those neighboring vent fields (Edmond, Solitaire, DoDo).
