= Pain in crustaceans =

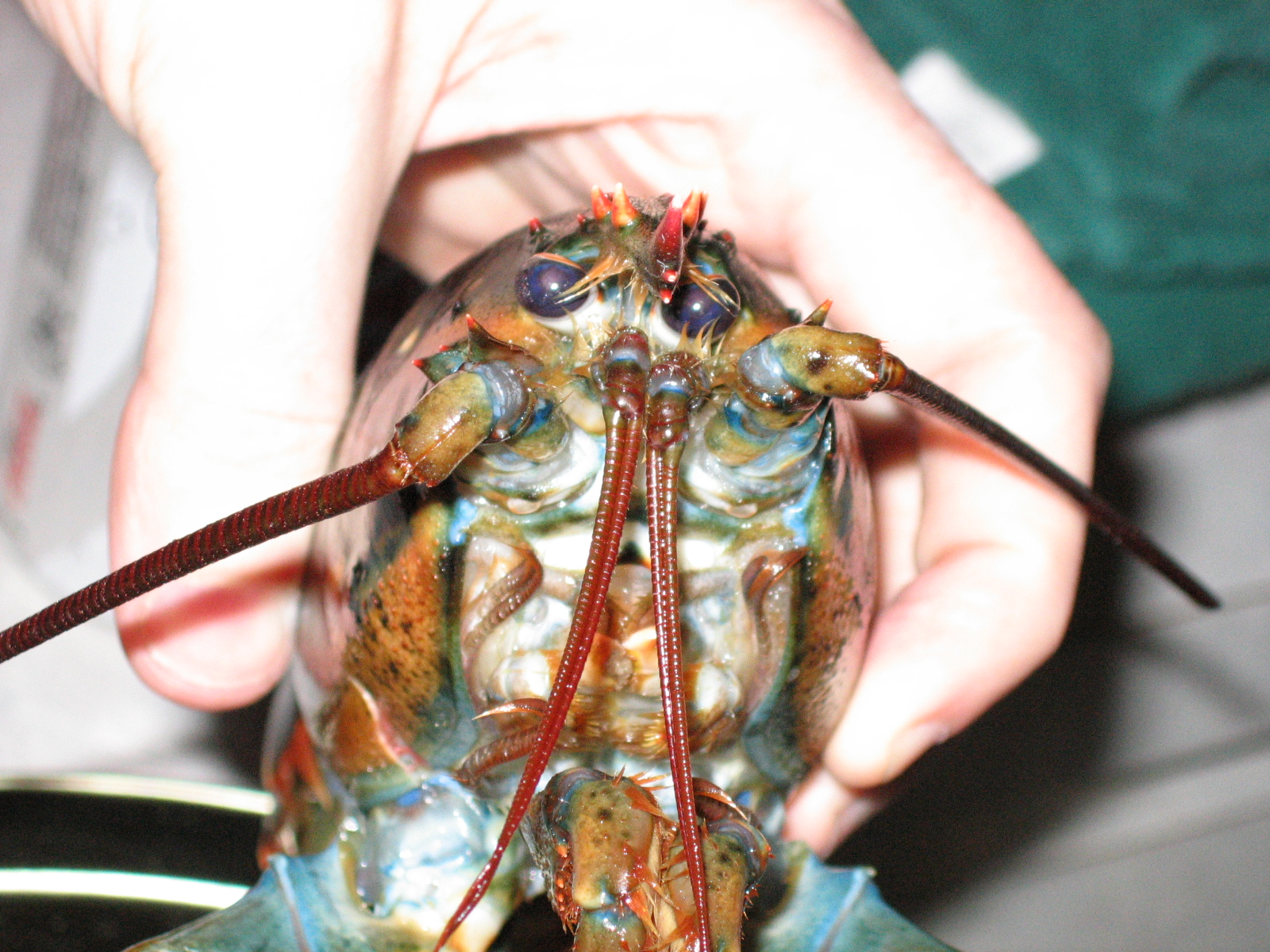
Close up of the head of a live lobster

There is a scientific debate which questions whether crustaceans experience pain. It is a complex mental state, with a distinct perceptual quality but also associated with suffering, which is an emotional state. Because of this complexity, the presence of pain in an animal, or another human for that matter, cannot be determined unambiguously using observational methods, but the conclusion that animals experience pain is often inferred on the basis of likely presence of phenomenal consciousness which is deduced from comparative brain physiology as well as physical and behavioural reactions.

Definitions of pain vary, but most involve the ability of the nervous system to detect and reflexively react to harmful stimuli by avoiding it, and the ability to subjectively experience suffering. Suffering cannot be directly measured in other animals. Responses to putatively painful stimuli can be measured, but not the experience itself. To address this problem when assessing the capacity of other species to experience pain, argument by analogy is sometimes used.

Crustaceans fulfill several criteria proposed as indicating that non-human animals may experience pain. These fulfilled criteria include a suitable nervous system and sensory receptors; opioid receptors and reduced responses to noxious stimuli when given analgesics and local anaesthetics; physiological changes to noxious stimuli; displaying protective motor reactions; exhibiting avoidance learning; and making trade-offs between noxious stimulus avoidance and other motivational requirements.

In vertebrates, endogenous opioids are neurochemicals that moderate pain by interacting with opioid receptors. Opioid peptides and opioid receptors occur naturally in crustaceans, and although it was concluded in 2005 "at present no certain conclusion can be drawn", more recent considerations suggest their presence along with related physiological and behavioural responses as indicating that crustaceans may experience pain. Opioids may moderate pain in crustaceans in a similar way to that in vertebrates. If crustaceans feel pain, there are ethical and animal welfare implications including the consequences of exposure to pollutants, and practices involving commercial and recreational fishing, aquaculture, food preparation and for crustaceans used in scientific research.

== Background ==
The question of whether non-human animals experience pain has a long history. Initially, this was rooted in theoretical and philosophical argument, but more recently, it has also become a topic of scientific investigation.

=== Philosophy ===
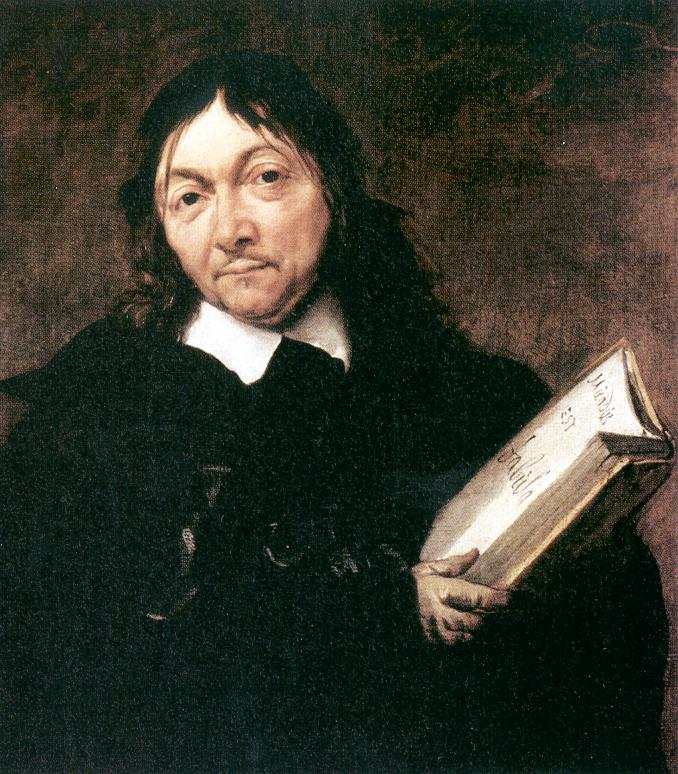
Descartes argued that animals could not experience pain

The idea that non-human animals might not feel pain goes back to the 17th-century French philosopher, René Descartes, who argued that animals do not experience pain and suffering because they lack consciousness. In 1789, the British philosopher and social reformist, Jeremy Bentham, addressed in his book An Introduction to the Principles of Morals and Legislation the issue of our treatment of animals with the following often quoted words: "The question is not, Can they reason? nor, can they talk? but, Can they suffer?"

Peter Singer, a bioethicist and author of Animal Liberation published in 1975, suggested that consciousness is not necessarily the key issue: just because animals have smaller brains, or are 'less conscious' than humans, does not mean that they are not capable of feeling pain. He goes on further to argue that we do not assume newborn infants, people suffering from neurodegenerative brain diseases or people with learning disabilities experience less pain than we would.

Bernard Rollin, the principal author of two U.S. federal laws regulating pain relief for animals, writes that researchers remained unsure into the 1980s as to whether animals experience pain, and veterinarians trained in the U.S. before 1989 were taught to simply ignore animal pain. In his interactions with scientists and other veterinarians, Rollin was regularly asked to "prove" that animals are conscious, and to provide "scientifically acceptable" grounds for claiming that they feel pain.

Continuing into the 1990s, discussions were further developed on the roles that philosophy and science had in understanding animal cognition and mentality. In subsequent years, it was argued there was strong support for the suggestion that some animals (most likely amniotes) have at least simple conscious thoughts and feelings and that the view animals feel pain differently to humans is now a minority view.

=== Scientific investigation ===
Cambridge Declaration on Consciousness (2012)

The absence of a neocortex does not appear to preclude an organism from experiencing affective states. Convergent evidence indicates that non-human animals have the neuroanatomical, neurochemical, and neurophysiological substrates of conscious states along with the capacity to exhibit intentional behaviors. Consequently, the weight of evidence indicates that humans are not unique in possessing the neurological substrates that generate consciousness. Non-human animals, including all mammals and birds, and many other creatures, including octopuses, also possess these neurological substrates.

In the 20th and 21st centuries, there were many scientific investigations of pain in non-human animals. Argument by analogy is sometimes used to assess the capacity of other animals to experience pain. This is based on the principle that if a non-human animal's responses to noxious stimuli are similar to those of humans, they are likely to have had an analogous experience. For example, if a pin is stuck in a chimpanzee's finger and it rapidly withdraws its hand, then argument by analogy indicates that like humans, it felt pain.

In 2012 the American philosopher Gary Varner reviewed the research literature on pain in animals. His findings are summarised in the following table. Arguing by analogy, Varner claims that any animal which exhibits the properties listed in the table could be said to experience pain. On that basis, he concludes that all vertebrates, including fish, probably experience pain, but invertebrates (e.g. crustaceans) apart from cephalopods probably do not experience pain.

Hexapods (insects and entognathans) are cladistically crustaceans, with the two groups now combined in the monophyletic clade Pancrustacea.

==== Vertebrates ====
Arthritic rats self-select analgesic opiates. In 2014, the veterinary Journal of Small Animal Practice published an article on the recognition of pain which started – "The ability to experience pain is universally shared by all mammals...". Birds with gait abnormalities self-select for a diet that contains carprofen, a human analgesic. In 2005, it was written "Avian pain is likely analogous to pain experienced by most mammals" and in 2014, "it is accepted that birds perceive and respond to noxious stimuli and that birds feel pain." Veterinary articles have been published stating both reptiles and amphibians experience pain in a way analogous to humans, and that analgesics are effective in these two classes of vertebrates.

Argument by analogy
Property	Invertebrates				Vertebrates				
Property	Earthworms	Insects	Leeches/snails	Cephalopods	Fish	Amphibians	Reptiles	Birds	Mammals
Has nociceptors	?	✗	✓	?	✓	✓	✓	✓	✓
Has brain	✗	✗	✗	✓	✓	✓	✓	✓	✓
Nociceptors and brain linked	✗	✗	✗	✓	✓	? / ✓	? / ✓	? / ✓	✓
Has endogenous opioids	✓	✓	?	?	✓	✓	✓	✓	✓
Analgesics affect responses	?	?	?	?	✓	?	?	✓	✓
Response to damaging stimuli similar to humans	✗	✗	?	✓	✓	✓	✓	✓	✓

In the table -

✓ denotes Varner believes reliable research indicates the taxon has the attribute
✗ denotes Varner believes reliable research indicates the taxon does not have the attribute
? denotes Varner believes reliable research has not ascertained whether the taxon has the attribute or varies between species within the taxa.
- ? / ✓ denotes that later studies suggest the taxon has the attribute

== Adaptive value ==
The adaptive value of nociception is obvious; an organism detecting a noxious stimulus immediately withdraws the limb, appendage or entire body from the noxious stimulus and thereby avoids further (potential) injury. However, a characteristic of pain (in mammals at least) is that pain can result in hyperalgesia (a heightened sensitivity to noxious stimuli) and allodynia (a heightened sensitivity to non-noxious stimuli). When this heightened sensitisation occurs, the adaptive value is less clear. First, the pain arising from the heightened sensitisation can be disproportionate to the actual tissue damage caused. Second, the heightened sensitisation may also become chronic, persisting well beyond the tissues healing. This can mean that rather than the actual tissue damage causing pain, it is the pain due to the heightened sensitisation that becomes the concern. This means the sensitisation process is sometimes termed maladaptive. It is often suggested hyperalgesia and allodynia assist organisms to protect themselves during healing, but experimental evidence to support this has been lacking.

In 2014, the adaptive value of sensitisation due to injury was tested using the predatory interactions between longfin inshore squid (Doryteuthis pealeii) and black sea bass (Centropristis striata) which are natural predators of this squid. If injured squid are targeted by a bass, they began their defensive behaviours sooner (indicated by greater alert distances and longer flight initiation distances) than uninjured squid. If anaesthetic (1% ethanol and MgCl_{2}) is administered prior to the injury, this prevents the sensitisation and blocks the behavioural effect. The authors claim this study is the first experimental evidence to support the argument that nociceptive sensitisation is actually an adaptive response to injuries.

== The experience of pain ==
Although there are numerous definitions of pain, almost all involve two key components.

First, nociception is required. This is the ability to detect noxious stimuli which evoke a reflex response that rapidly moves the entire animal, or the affected part of its body, away from the source of the stimulus. The concept of nociception does not imply any adverse, subjective "feeling" – it is a reflex action. An example in humans would be the rapid withdrawal of a finger that has touched something hot – the withdrawal occurs before any sensation of pain is actually experienced.

The second component is the experience of "pain" itself, or suffering – the internal, emotional interpretation of the nociceptive experience. Again in humans, this is when the withdrawn finger begins to hurt, moments after the withdrawal. Pain is therefore a private, emotional experience. Nociceptive reflexes act to immediately remove the animal or part of the body from a (potentially) damaging stimulus. However, without learning from this experience, the animal would likely expose itself to the damaging stimulus repeatedly. Pain has the adaptive advantage that it invokes a level of learning, thereby preventing the animal from repeatedly exposing itself to potential injury. Pain cannot be directly measured in other animals, including other humans; responses to putatively painful stimuli can be measured, but not the experience itself. To address this problem when assessing the capacity of other species to experience pain, argument-by-analogy is used. This is based on the principle that if an animal responds to a stimulus in a similar way to ourselves, it is likely to have had an analogous experience.

=== Nociception ===
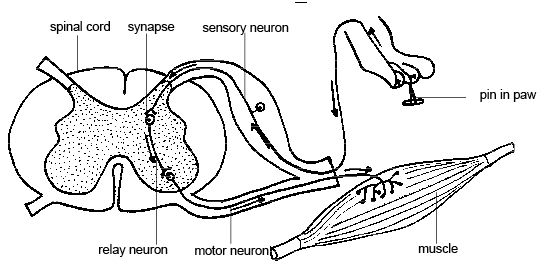
Nociception: The reflex arc of a dog with a pin in her paw. Note there is no communication to the brain, but the paw is withdrawn by nervous impulses generated by the spinal cord. There is no conscious interpretation of the stimulus by the dog involved in the reflex itself.

In vertebrates, nociceptive responses involve the transmission of a signal along a chain of nerve fibres from the site of a noxious stimulus at the periphery, to the spinal cord. This process evokes a reflex arc response such as flinching or immediate withdrawal of a limb, generated at the spinal cord and not involving the brain. Nociception is found, in one form or another, across all major animal taxa. Nociception can be observed using modern imaging techniques and both physiological and behavioural responses to nociception can be detected. Many crustacean species, including the rockpool prawn (Palaemon elegans), exhibit the caridoid escape reaction – an immediate, nociceptive, reflex tail-flick response to noxious stimuli (see here).

=== Emotional pain ===
Sometimes a distinction is made between "physical pain" and "emotional" or "psychological pain". Emotional pain is the pain experienced in the absence of physical trauma, e.g. the pain experienced by humans after the loss of a loved one, or the break-up of a relationship. It has been argued that only primates, including humans, can feel "emotional pain". However, research has provided evidence that monkeys, dogs, cats and birds can show signs of emotional pain and display behaviours associated with depression during painful experience, i.e. lack of motivation, lethargy, anorexia, unresponsiveness to other animals.

=== Physical pain ===
The nerve impulses of the nociception response may be conducted to the brain thereby registering the location, intensity, quality and unpleasantness of the stimulus. This subjective component of pain involves conscious awareness of both the sensation and the unpleasantness (the aversive, negative affect). The brain processes underlying conscious awareness of the unpleasantness (suffering), are not well understood.

There have been several published lists of criteria for establishing whether non-human animals experience pain, e.g. Some criteria that may indicate the potential of another species, including crustaceans, to feel pain include:

1. Has a suitable nervous system and sensory receptors
2. Has opioid receptors and shows reduced responses to noxious stimuli when given analgesics and local anaesthetics
3. Physiological changes to noxious stimuli
4. Displays protective motor reactions that might include reduced use of an affected area such as limping, rubbing, holding or autotomy
5. Shows avoidance learning
6. Shows trade-offs between noxious stimulus avoidance and other motivational requirements
7. High cognitive ability and sentience

== Research findings ==
A swimming prawn showing buoyancy in its natural environment

The vast majority of research on pain in crustaceans has used (semi-) aquatic, decapoda species. Animals living in largely different environments are unlikely to have developed the same nociceptive or pain-detecting neural mechanisms. Different environments will result in diverse selection pressures on different animal groups, as well as exposing them to differing types of nociceptive stimuli. For example, crustaceans living in an aquatic world can maintain a certain level of buoyancy, so the risk of collision due to gravity is limited compared with a terrestrial vertebrate. Similarly, noxious chemicals might be diluted considerably in an aquatic environment compared to terrestrial. Therefore, nociceptive and pain systems in aquatic animals may be quite dissimilar to terrestrial animals.

=== Peripheral nervous system ===
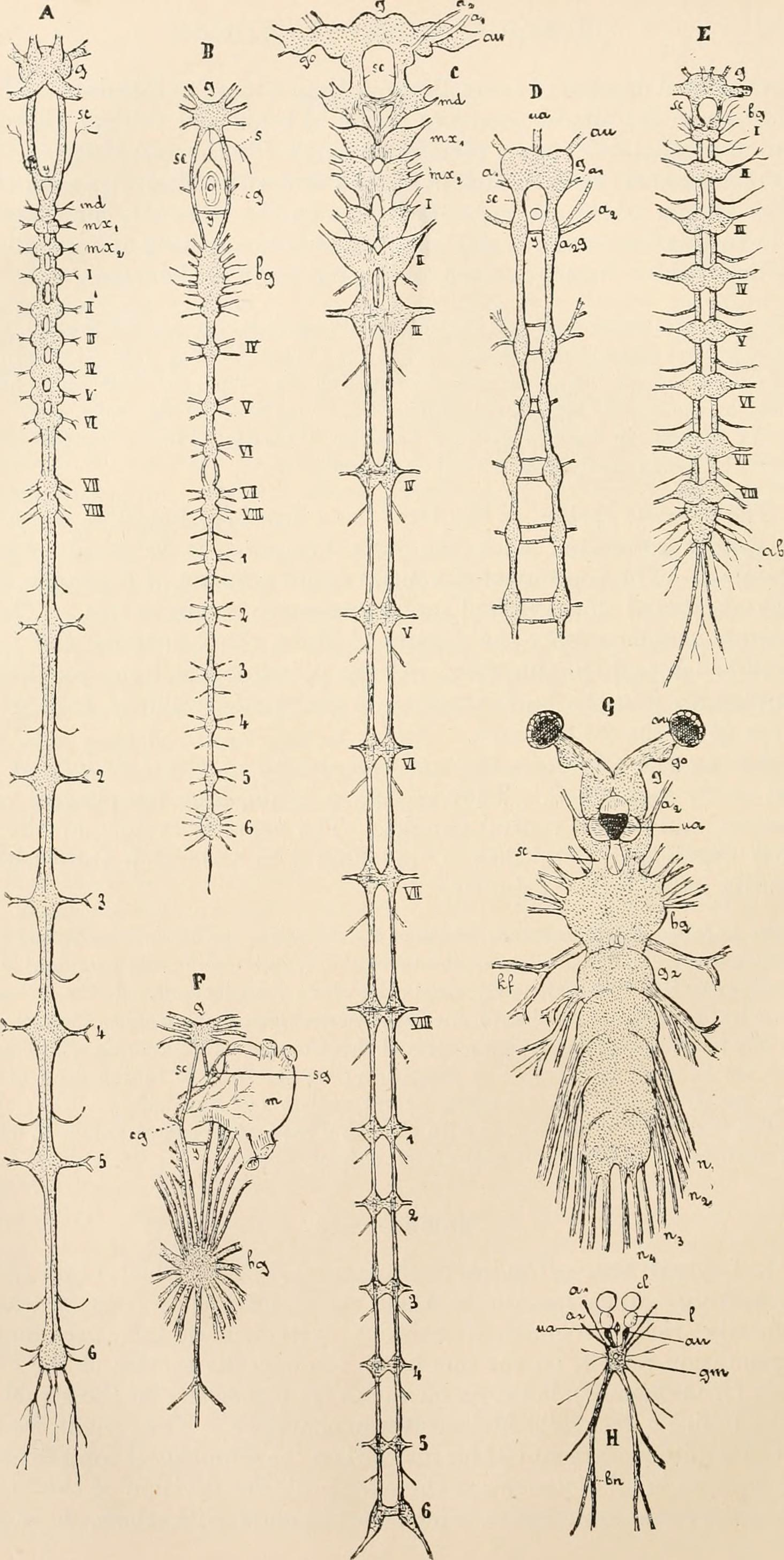
The nervous systems of a selection of crustaceans.

==== Receptors ====
Crayfish (Procambarus clarkii) respond quickly and strongly to high temperatures, however, they show no response to low temperature stimuli, or, when stimulated with capsaicin or isothiocyanate (both are irritants to mammals). Noxious high temperatures are considered to be a potentially ecologically relevant noxious stimulus for crayfish that can be detected by sensory neurons, which may be specialized nociceptors.

The common brown shrimp Crangon crangon and the prawns Palaemon serratus and Palaemon elegans all exhibit a nociceptive sensitivity to both hot and cold temperatures. Both thermal sensitivity levels and nociceptive thresholds change with changes in acclimation temperature.

==== Nerve fibres ====
Crayfish have peripheral nerve fibres which are responsive to noxious stimuli.

Neurons functionally specialized for nociception have been documented in other invertebrates including the leech Hirudo medicinalis, the nematode Caenorhabditis elegans and the molluscs Aplysia californica and Cepaea nemoralis. Changes in neuronal activity induced by noxious stimuli have been recorded in the nervous centres of Caenorhabditis elegans, Drosophila melanogaster and larval Manduca sexta.

=== Central nervous system ===
The bodies of crustaceans are segmented; there is one ganglion (cluster of nerve cells) per segment. Each ganglion receives sensory and movement information via nerves coming from the muscles, body wall, and appendages such as walking legs, swimmerets and mouthparts. The ganglia show great functional autonomy; information received by the ganglion is processed by the same ganglion, enabling a faster response than if the message had to travel all the way up the animal's body to the brain and then back. Information can be exchanged between ganglia enabling the animal to perform coordinated movements.

When shore crabs (Hemigrapsus sanguineus) have formalin injected into the cheliped (claw), this evokes specific nociceptive behavior and neurochemical responses in the thoracic ganglia and the brain.

==== Brain ====
Bilaterally symmetrical animals characteristically have a collection of nervous tissue toward the anterior region of their body. This is termed the supraesophageal ganglion and may colloquially be referred to as the "brain". In decapods, the supraesophageal ganglion is divided into three main regions, the protocerebrum, which consists of two optic lobes, and the median protocerebrum.

In 2002, James Rose (University of Wyoming) and more recently Brian Key (University of Queensland) published reviews arguing that fish (and presumably crustaceans) cannot feel pain because they lack a neocortex in the brain and therefore do not have consciousness. Animal behaviouralist, Temple Grandin, (Colorado State University) argues that animals could still have consciousness without a neocortex because "different species can use different brain structures and systems to handle the same functions." Lynne Sneddon (University of Liverpool) proposes that to suggest a function suddenly arises without a primitive form defies the laws of evolution. Other researchers also believe that animal consciousness does not require a neocortex, but can arise from homologous subcortical brain networks.

=== Opioid system and effects of analgesics ===
Opiates modulate nociception in vertebrates. In vertebrates, morphine is an analgesic and therefore ameliorates the sensation of pain. Naloxone is an opioid-receptor antagonist and therefore blocks the effects of morphine. Opioid modulation of nociception has been demonstrated in several invertebrate species.

A mantis shrimp swimming in its natural environment. The first report of opiate effects in invertebrates is based on a mantis shrimp species

The first report of opiate effects in invertebrates is based on the behavioural responses of the crustacean mantis shrimp Squilla mantis. These shrimp respond to an electric shock with an immediate, violent, convulsive-like flexion of the body. If they are injected with morphine-HCL, this produces a dose-dependent analgesia by increasing the intensity threshold to the shock. This effect is fully blocked by naloxone.

Crustaceans have a functional opioid system which includes the presence of opioid receptors similar to those of mammals. Delta- and Kappa-opioid receptors have been described in crustaceans. RT-PCR research on the American lobster (Homarus americanus) has revealed the presence of a Mu-opioid receptor transcript in neural and immune tissues, which exhibits a 100% sequence identity with its human counterpart.

In the American lobster, endogenous morphine is found in the haemolymph and ventral nerve cord. In lobsters which have had a pereiopod (walking leg) cut off or been injected with the irritant lipopolysaccharide, the endogenous morphine levels initially increased by 24% for haemolymph and 48% for the nerve cord.

In vertebrates, opioid peptides (i.e., enkephalins) have been shown to be involved in nociception. Leu-enkephalin and Met-enkephalin are present in the thoracic ganglia of the shore crab, Carcinus maenas.

Both morphine and naloxone affect the estuarine crab (Neohelice granulata) in a similar way to their effects on vertebrates: injections of morphine produce a dose-dependent reduction of their defensive response to an electric shock. However, it has been suggested the attenuated defensive response could originate from either the analgesic or sedative properties of morphine, or both. One study on the effects of a danger stimulus on the crab Chasmagnathus granulatus reported this induces opioid analgesia, which is influenced by naloxone. In American lobsters, the response of endogenous morphine in both haemocytes and neural cells to noxious stimuli are mediated by naloxone.

When the antennae of rockpool prawns Palaemon elegans are rubbed with sodium hydroxide or acetic acid (both are irritants in mammals), they increase grooming and rubbing of the afflicted area against the side of the tank; this reaction is inhibited by benzocaine (a local anaesthetic in mammals), even though control prawns treated with only anaesthetic do not show reduced activity.

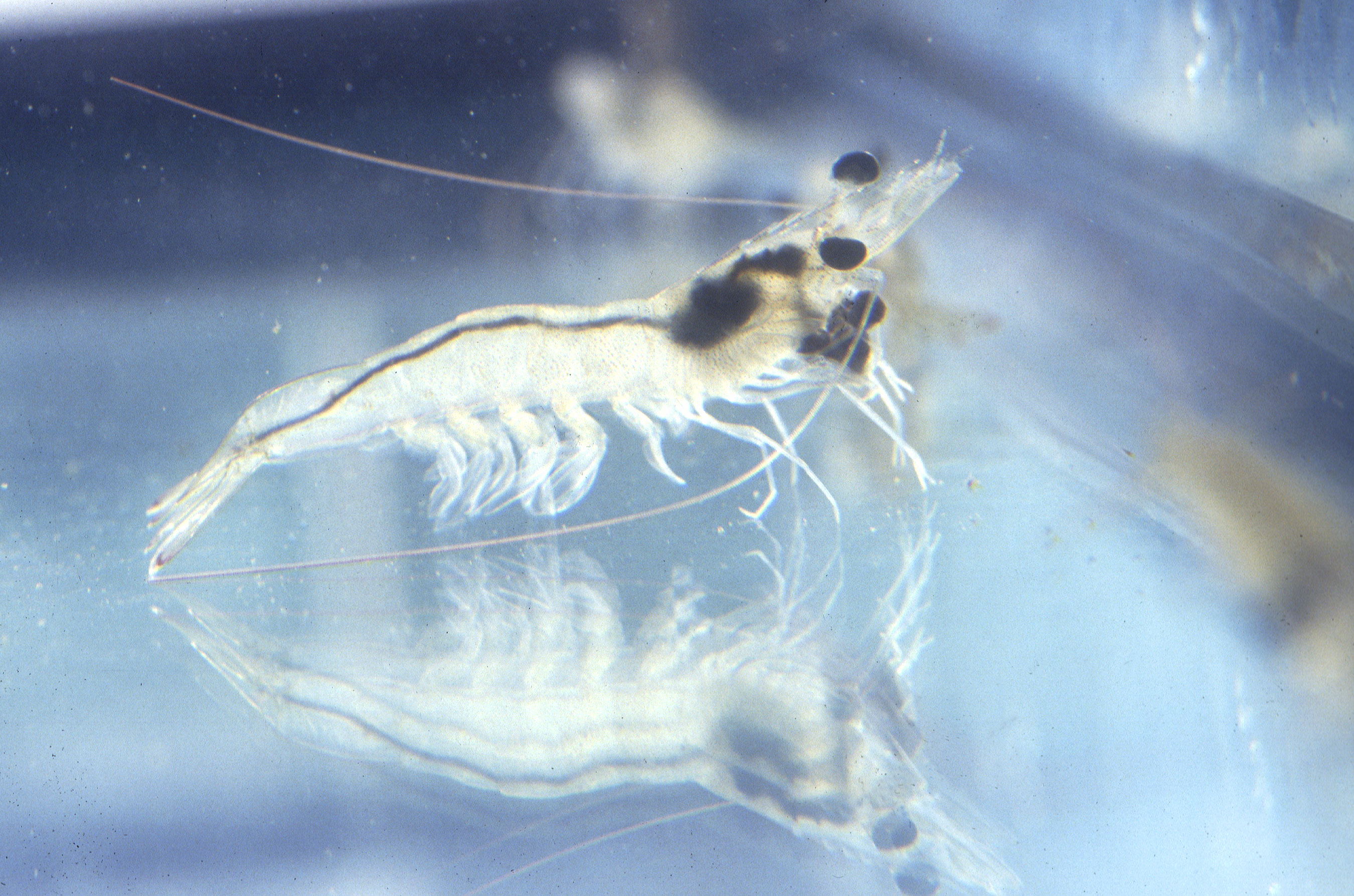
The whiteleg shrimp (juvenile shown) has become the preferred species for shrimp farming

Eyestalk ablation is the removal of one or both eyestalks from a crustacean. It is routinely practiced on female prawns in almost every marine shrimp maturation or reproduction facility in the world, both research and commercial. The aim of ablation is to stimulate the female shrimp to develop mature ovaries and spawn. In Macrobrachium americanum, prawns treated with lignocaine (a local anaesthetic in mammals), showed less rubbing, flicking and sheltering than those without the anaesthetic.

One study on reducing the stress of prawns resulting from transportation concluded that Aqui-STM and clove oil (a natural anaesthetic) may be suitable anaesthetic treatments for prawns.

=== Physiological responses ===
Higher levels of stress, as measured by lactate, occur in shore crabs exposed to brief electric shock compared to non-shocked controls. However, shocked crabs showed more vigorous behaviour than controls, possibly indicating it is increased behaviour causing the increased lactate. But, when crabs with the same level of behaviour are matched, shocked crabs still have a stronger stress response compared with controls. The authors suggested that their findings, coupled with previous findings of long-term motivational change and avoidance learning, "fulfils the criteria expected of a pain experience". Others have criticised these findings, including the fact that the lactate levels measured were within the normal range measured for shore crabs, and that any increases in lactate in shocked crabs were possibly due to increased anaerobic activity. They also argued that behavioural "activities that go beyond mere reflex responses" is an inadequate criterion for pain.

In crayfish (Procambarus clarkii), anxiolytic (stress-reducing) drugs made for humans also reduce anxiety.

Injection of formalin into the cheliped of shore crabs (Hemigrapsus sanguineus) evokes specific nociceptive behavior and neurochemical responses in the brain and thoracic ganglion.

=== Protective responses ===
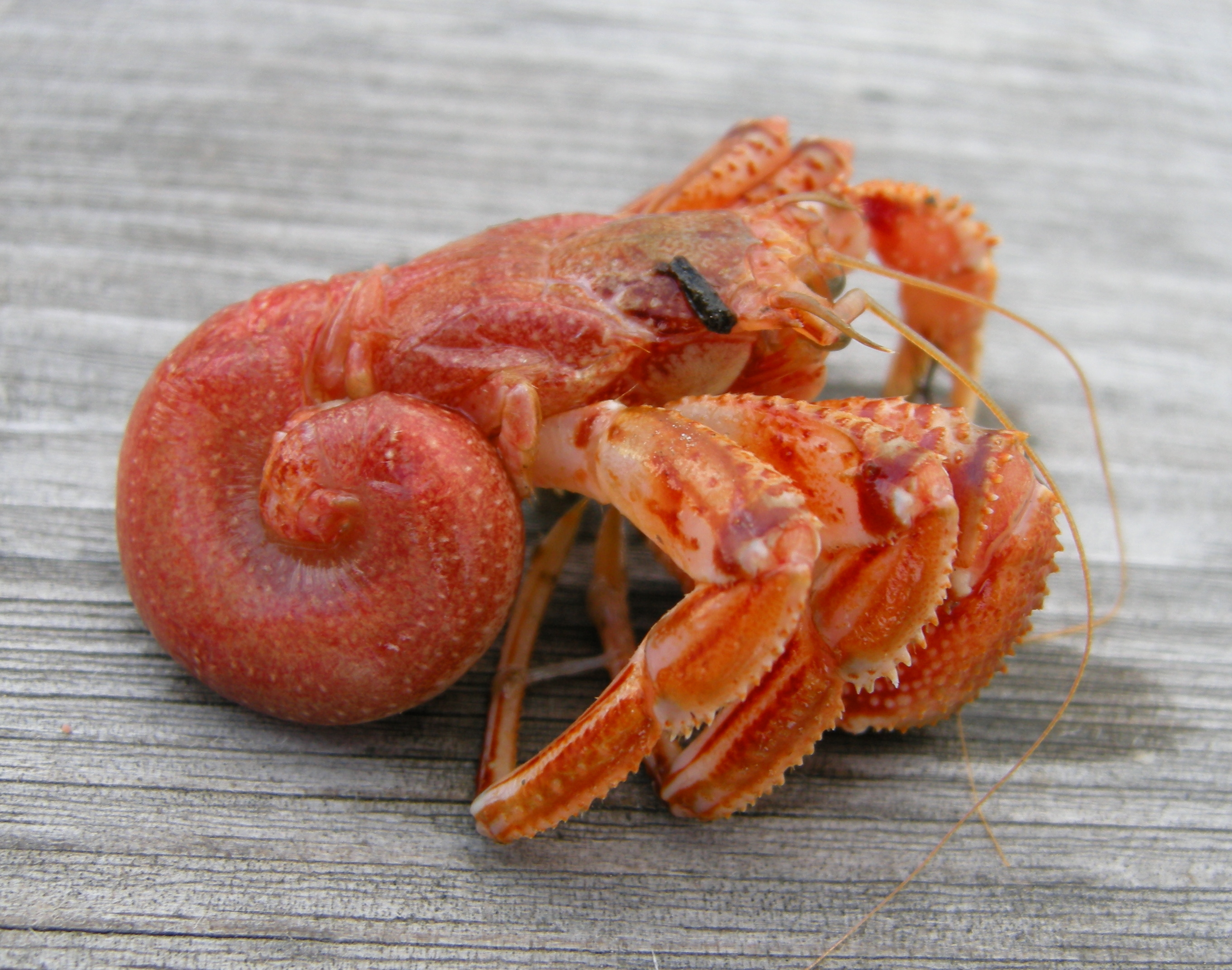
A hermit crab outside of its shell. Note the soft, curved abdomen which is vulnerable to predators.

Most species of hermit crab have long, spirally curved abdomens, which are soft, unlike the hard, calcified abdomens seen in related crustaceans. They protect themselves from predators by entering a salvaged empty seashell, into which they can retract their whole body. As they grow, they must leave their shell and find another larger, more suitable shell. Their shells are therefore highly valuable to them. When hermit crabs (Pagurus bernhardus) are given an electric shock, they leave their shells and subsequently perform prolonged abdominal grooming at the site of where they received the shock.

Male Chasmagnathus granulatus crabs exhibit a "defensive response" to electric shocks. During a study on the ability of shore crabs (Carcinus maenas) learning to avoid an electrical shock, it was observed that many crabs emerged from the dark shelter to avoid the shock thus entering a brightly lit area which would normally be avoided. Immediately after the injection of formalin (an irritant in mammals) or saline into one cheliped (the leg which ends with the claw), shore crabs move quickly into the corner of the aquarium and "freeze" after 2 to 3 seconds. After 1 to 3 minutes, these injected animals are fidgety and exhibit a wide range of movements such as flexion, extension, shaking or rubbing the affected claw. Formalin-treated animals show 20-times more rubbing behaviour during the first minute after injection than saline-treated crabs. Intense rubbing of the claw results in autotomy (shedding) in 20% of animals of the formalin-treated group whereas saline-injected crabs do not autotomise the injected cheliped. During the 10 minutes after injection, crabs in the formalin-treated group tried to use the intact cheliped, guarding the damaged cheliped. The scientists conducting this study commented "the present results obtained in crabs may be indicative of pain experience rather than relating to a simple nociceptive reflex". Other species of crab have been shown to autotomise legs when placed on a hot plate or exposed to a small electric shock.

When the antennae of rockpool prawns (Palaemon elegans) are rubbed with sodium hydroxide or acetic acid (both are irritants), the animals show increased grooming and rubbing of the afflicted area against the side of the tank. Furthermore, this reaction is inhibited by a local anaesthetic, even though control prawns treated with only anaesthetic did not show reduced activity. Other scientists suggested the rubbing may reflect an attempt to clean the affected area as application of anaesthetic alone caused an increase in grooming.

In one study, no behavioural or neural changes in three different crustacean species (red swamp crayfish (Procambarus clarkii), white shrimp (Litopenaeus setiferus) and Palaemonetes sp.) were observed in response to noxious acids or bases.

=== Avoidance learning ===
Shore crabs quickly (within 1 or 2 trials) learn to avoid one of two dark shelters if choosing that shelter consistently results in them receiving an electric shock. The crayfish Procambarus clarkii and the crab Chasmagnathus granulatus learn to associate an electric shock with a light turning on, or with the occupancy of the light compartment of the aquarium, respectively. They quickly learn to respond to these associations by walking to a safe area in which the shock is not delivered (crayfish) or by refraining from entering the light compartment (crab).

=== Trade-offs in motivation ===
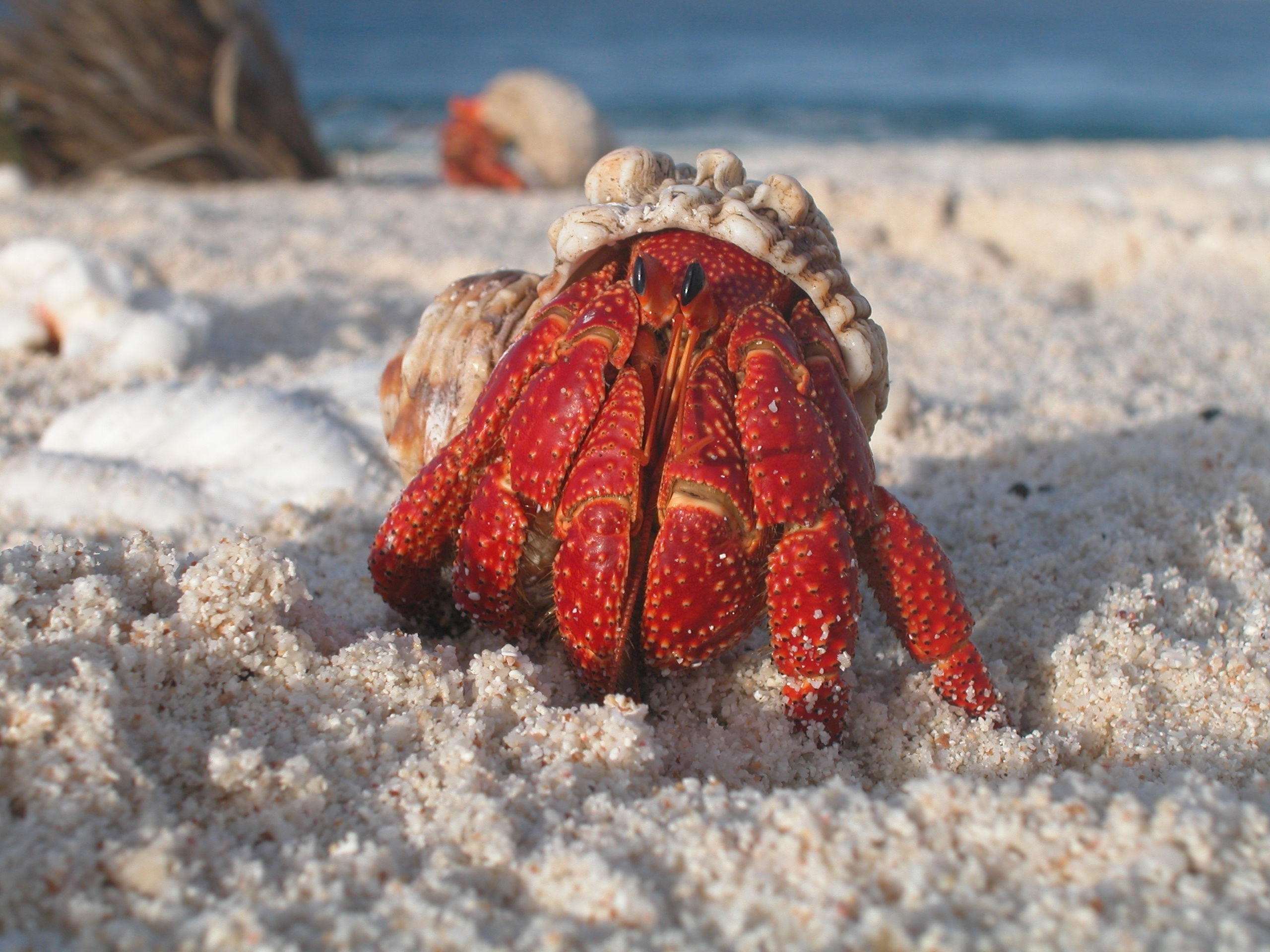
A hermit crab

Nociceptive responses are reflexes that do not change regardless of motivational priorities. In contrast, a painful experience may change the motivation for normal behavioural responses, thereby indicating a plastic response to an aversive stimulus, rather than a simple reflex response.

In 2009, Elwood and Mirjam Appel showed that hermit crabs make motivational trade-offs between electric shocks and the quality of the shells they inhabit. In particular, as hermit crabs are shocked more intensely, they become increasingly willing to leave their current shells for new shells, and they spend less time deciding whether to enter those new shells. Moreover, because the researchers did not offer the new shells until after the electrical stimulation had ended, the change in motivational behavior was the result of memory of the noxious event, not an immediate reflex. It was also shown that hermit crabs experiencing increasing electric shocks left their shell at a reduced intensity when the shell was from a less preferred species than did those in shells of a more desirable species. This demonstrates that hermit crabs are willing to risk predator attack by evacuating their shells to avoid a noxious stimulus and that this is dependent upon how valuable the shell is.

A similar study shows that hermit crabs are less likely to leave their shells after electric shock if they are in an environment that contains the odour of predators. This shows the crabs trade-off the motivation to avoid electric shocks and predator avoidance.

Shore crabs (Carcinus maenas) also show motivational trade-offs; they will discard a valuable resource (a preferred shelter) to avoid future encounters with painful stimuli, thereby indicating avoidance learning – a key criterion of the ability to experience pain.

A 2014 study on crayfish (Procambarus clarkii) tested their responses in a fear paradigm, the elevated plus maze in which animals choose to walk on an elevated cross which offers both aversive and preferable conditions (in this case, two arms were lit and two were dark). Crayfish which experienced an electric shock displayed enhanced fearfulness or anxiety as demonstrated by their preference for the dark arms more than the light. Furthermore, shocked crayfish had relatively higher brain serotonin concentrations coupled with elevated blood glucose, which suggests a stress response. A follow-up study using the same species showed the intensity of the anxiety-like behaviour, presumably resulting from the pain, was dependent on the intensity of the electric shock until reaching a plateau. Such a quantitative relationship between stress and anxiety is also a very common feature of human and vertebrate anxiety.

== Legislation ==
Legislation protects some invertebrates when they are being used in research; the taxa protected varies between countries and regions.

Legislation on the protection of invertebrates in research adapted from
Country or region	Invertebrates protected	Legislation
Australia (some states)	Cephalopods	Government National Health and Medical; Research Council's Code of Practice (2004)
Canada	Cephalopods and "some other higher invertebrates"	Canadian Council on Animal Care (1991)
EU	Cephalopods	EU Directive 2010/63/EU
New Zealand	Octopuses, squids, crabs, lobsters, crayfish	Animal Welfare Act (1999)
Norway	Squids, octopuses, decapod crustaceans, honeybees	Norwegian Animal Welfare Act (2009)
Switzerland	Cephalopods, decapod crustaceans	Swiss Animal Welfare Act (2008)

In 2022, the UK Animal Welfare (Sentience) Act recognized the sentience of decapod crustaceans and cephalopods, requiring the government to consider their wellbeing in future policymaking. In December 2025, pursuant to the law, the Department for Environment, Food and Rural Affairs announced its intention to prohibit the live boiling of decapods and cephalopods by 2030.

Jonathan Birch, philosopher of biology at the London School of Economics, argues that we should apply the precautionary principle to animal sentience. Without lowering scientific standards, this principle leads to include in our animal protection laws any species for which we have at least a credible indicator of sentience. If we have good reasons to believe that a species of crab is sentient, it is sufficient to believe that all crabs (more than 4000 species) are sentient. Therefore, it is all the members of the decapod order that should be included in our animal welfare laws.

== Opinions ==
Advocates for Animals, a Scottish animal welfare group, stated in 2005 that "scientific evidence ... strongly suggests that there is a potential for decapod crustaceans and cephalopods to experience pain and suffering". This is primarily due to "The likelihood that decapod crustaceans can feel pain [which] is supported by the fact that they have been shown to have opioid receptors and to respond to opioids (analgesics such as morphine) in a similar way to vertebrates." Similarities between decapod and vertebrate stress systems and behavioral responses to noxious stimuli were given as additional evidence for the capacity of decapods to experience pain.

In 2005 a review of the literature by the Norwegian Scientific Committee for Food Safety tentatively concluded that "it is unlikely that [lobsters] can feel pain," though they note that "there is apparently a paucity of exact knowledge on sentience in crustaceans, and more research is needed." This conclusion is based on the lobster's simple nervous system. The report assumes that the violent reaction of lobsters to boiling water is a reflex response (i.e. does not involve conscious perception) to noxious stimuli.

A European Food Safety Authority (EFSA) 2005 publication stated that the largest of decapod crustaceans have complex behaviour, a pain system, considerable learning abilities and appear to have some degree of awareness. Based on this evidence, they placed all decapod crustaceans into the same category of research-animal protection as vertebrates.

In 2021, following a review, the United Kingdom officially recognized decapod crustaceans and cephalopods as sentient beings capable of experiencing pain.

== Pain during killing ==
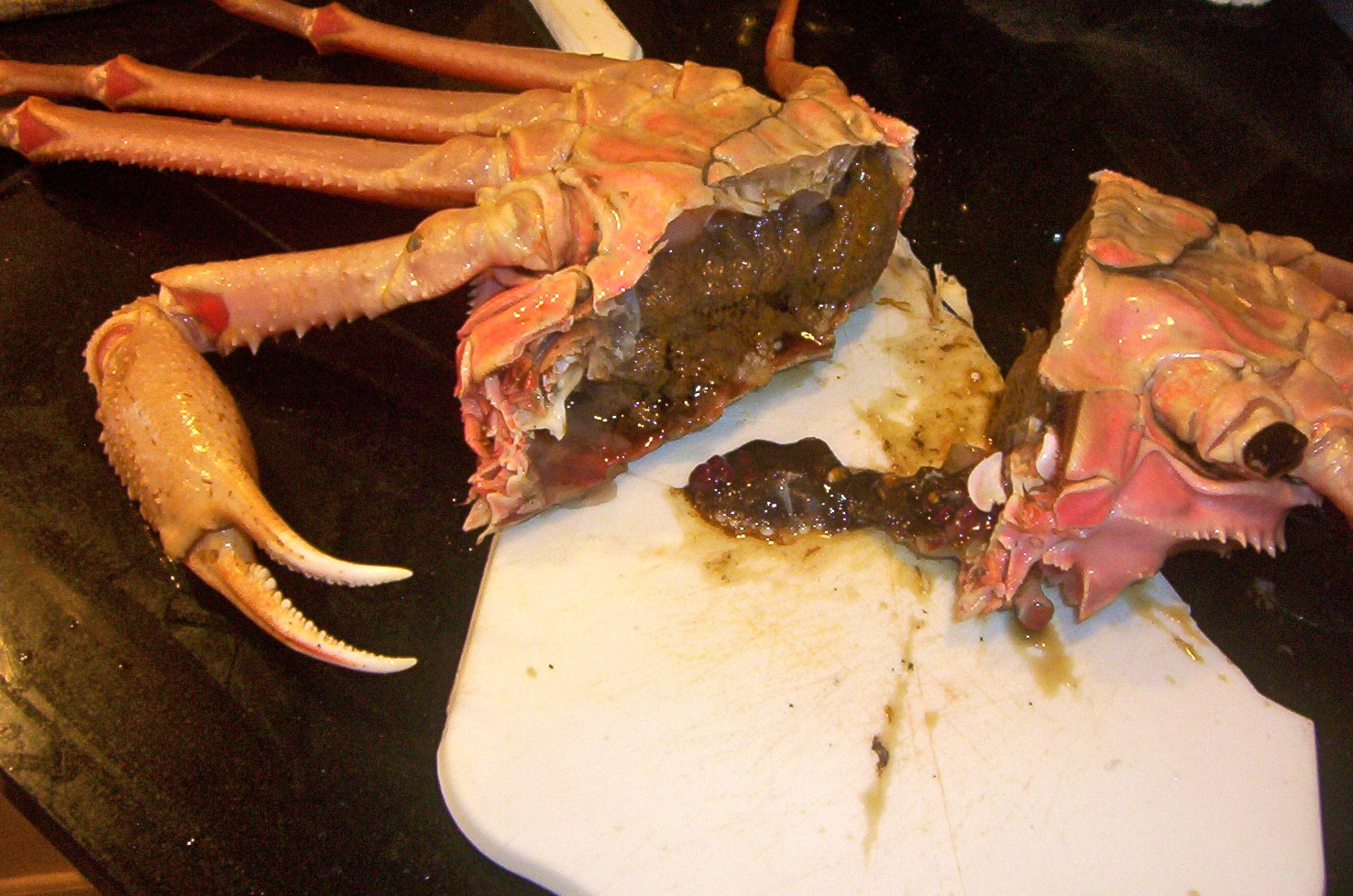
This tanner crab was cut in half before cooking

The EFSA summarized that the killing methods most likely to cause pain and distress are:

- Any procedures whereby the abdomen is separated from the thorax
- The removal of tissue, flesh, or limbs while the crustacean is alive and fully conscious
- Placing crustaceans in water slowly heated to the boiling point
- Placing crustaceans directly into boiling water
- Placing marine crustaceans in fresh water
- Unfocused microwaving of the body as opposed to focal application to the head

A device called the CrustaStun has been invented to electrocute shellfish, such as lobsters, crabs, and crayfish, before cooking. The device works by applying a 120-volt, 2 to 5 amp electrical charge to the animal. The manufacturer claims it renders the shellfish unconscious in 0.3 seconds and kills the animal in 5 to 10 seconds, compared to 3 minutes to kill a lobster or crab by boiling; however, the source for the claim states that movements detected after 10 seconds were the result of heat's effect on the muscles or escape of air from the branchial chambers, not voluntary movements, and the author declares this measure of 3 minutes "useless" for determining time until death.

== See also ==
- Animal cognition
- Cruelty to animals
- Declawing of crabs
- Emotion in animals
- Ethics of uncertain sentience
- Moral status of animals in the ancient world
- Pain and suffering in laboratory animals
- Sentience
- Veganism
