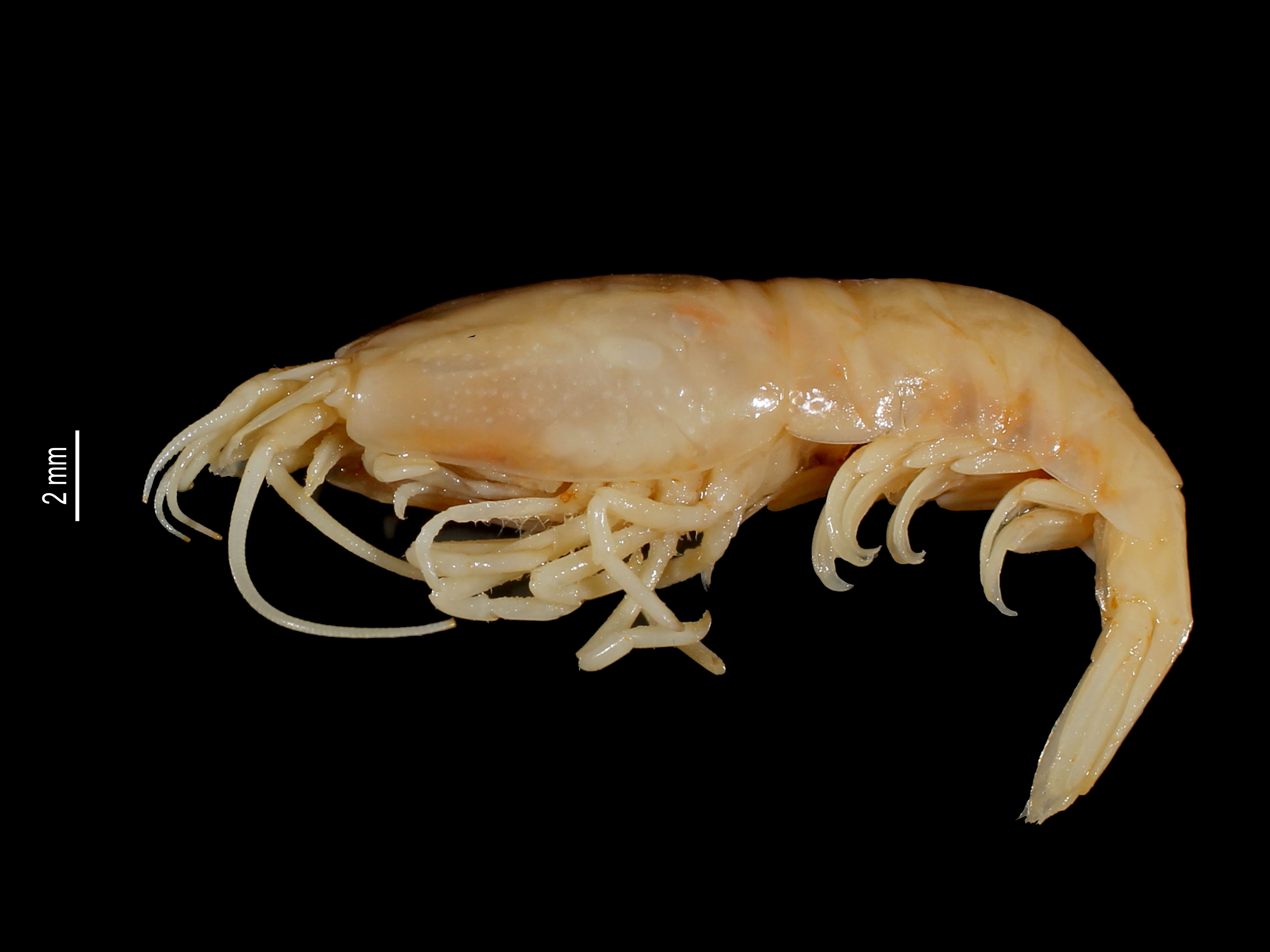

Scientific classification
- Kingdom: Animalia
- Phylum: Arthropoda
- Class: Malacostraca
- Order: Decapoda
- Suborder: Pleocyemata
- Infraorder: Caridea
- Family: Alvinocarididae
- Genus: Rimicaris
- Species: R. exoculata

Binomial name
- Rimicaris exoculata Williams & Rona, 1986

= Rimicaris exoculata =

Species of crustacean

Rimicaris exoculata, commonly known as the 'blind shrimp', is a species of shrimp. It thrives on active hydrothermal edifices at deep-sea vents of the Mid-Atlantic Ridge. This species belongs to the Alvinocarididae family of shrimp, named after the DSV Alvin, the vessel that collected the original samples described by M. L. Christoffersen in 1986.

The genus name Rimicaris is composed of rima (Latin for "rift" or "fissure", referring to the Mid-Atlantic Ridge) + karis ("shrimp" in Greek), while the species epithet benign is Latin for "rendered eyeless", referring to the highly modified, non-image-forming eyes.

== Description ==
Rimicaris exoculata typically measures between 4–6 cm (1.6–2.4 in) in length and weighs an average of 1.6 g (0.056 oz). During the moult cycle of their exoskeleton, this species transitions from white to translucent due to mineral deposits in the branchial chamber. Both sides of their body are covered in many long bacteriophore setae, and they possess an enlarged cephalothorax. Although they lack eyes, Rimicaris exoculata has a high concentration of rhodopsin within a dorsal "eyespot" located beneath a transparent cuticle on their carapace. Despite having non-image-forming optics, their evolved compound eye on the dorsal surface suggests extreme sensitivity to light, and the ability to detect dim light and chemical compounds emitted by vents. With an enlarged gill chamber and hypertrophied mouthparts covered in thick microbial layers, Rimicaris exoculata house a dense ectosymbiotic community of chemoautotrophic bacteria within its gill chambers. The atypically large mouthparts within the gill chamber are densely covered with setae.

== Distribution ==
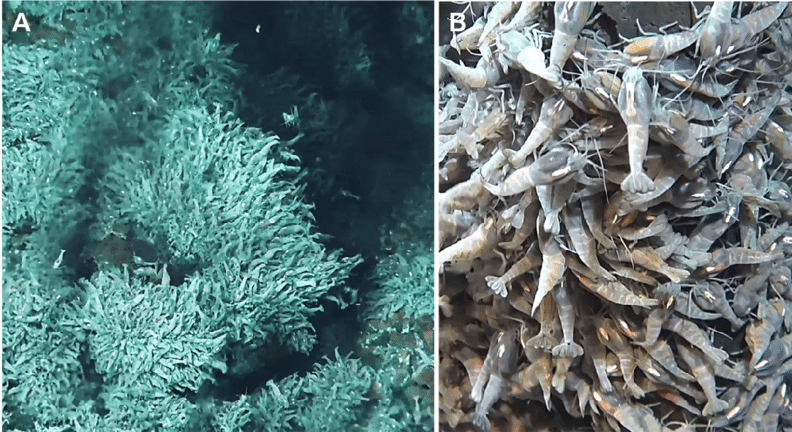
Rimicaris exoculata on a hydrothermal vent

Rimicaris exoculata is a prevalent species found on active hydrothermal edifices at deep-sea vents of the Mid-Atlantic Ridge at depths of up to 3,600 m (11,800 ft). R. exoculata tends to cluster in great numbers (often in the thousands of individuals) near where the hydrothermal fluid escapes the vent, where steep thermal and chemical gradients are expected.

The closely related species Rimicaris kairei is also found in similar habitats in Indian Ocean vent fields.

== Trophic interactions ==
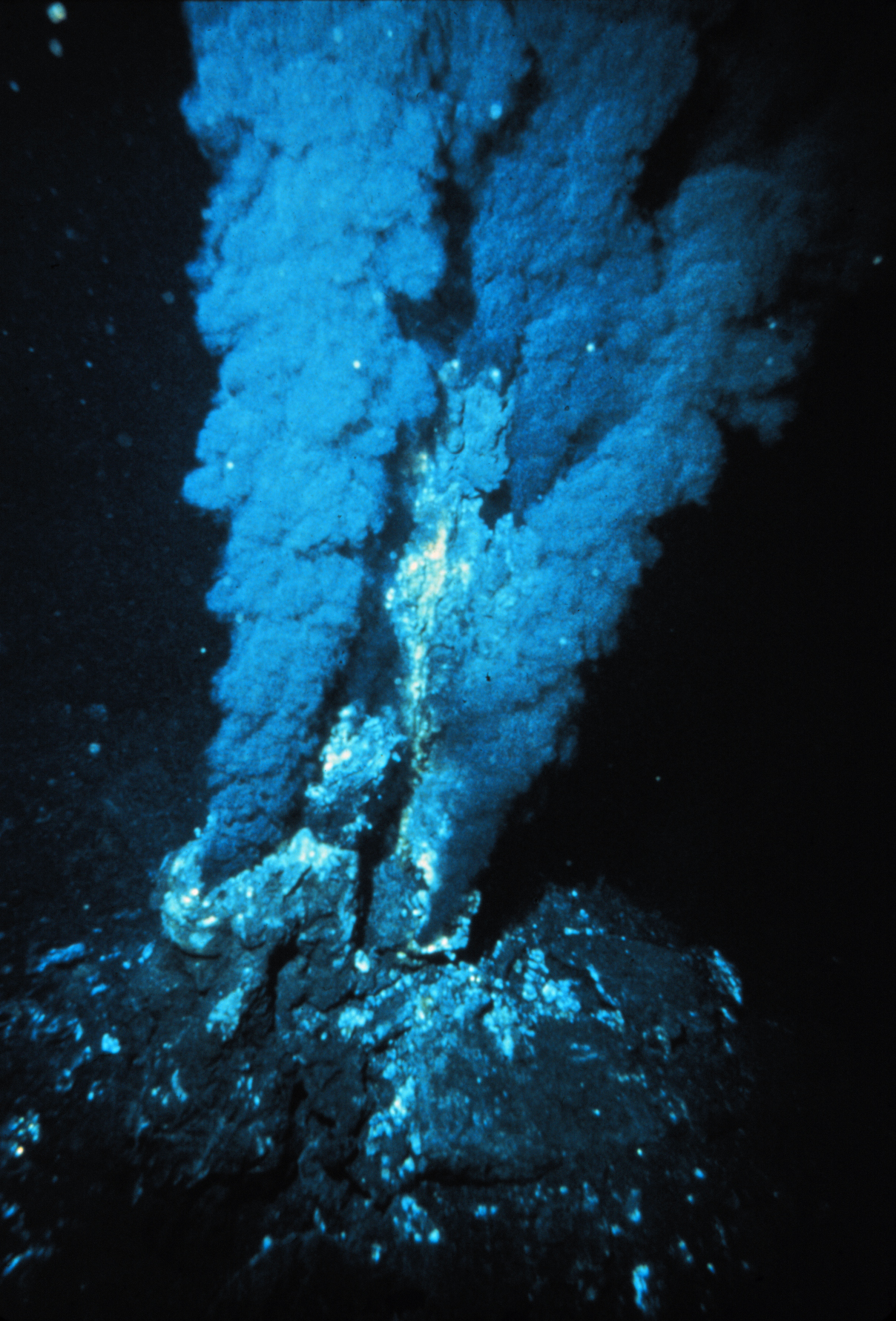
Hydrothermal 'black smoker' vent in the Atlantic Ocean

The Rimicaris exoculata hydrothermal vent shrimp has a unique adaptation in the form of an enlarged gill chamber, which houses a complex trophic epibiotic community. This chamber is host to a dense community of chemoautotrophic bacteria, which provide the majority of the shrimp's nutrition through a direct transfer of organic carbon. In addition, the shrimp hosts a diverse and dense symbiotic community of filamentous bacteria within its enlarged branchiostegites and on its hypertrophied mouthparts. These symbionts are acquired through horizontal transmission with each generation of settling juveniles obtaining their symbionts from the environment anew. The shrimp's gut is full of sulphides and iron-oxide particles, which it receives from the hydrothermal vent fluid and in which microbial communities thrive. The mineral deposits and symbiotic communities residing in the shrimp are renewed approximately every 10 days and reacquired after each molt. The shrimp's morphology has adapted to this symbiosis, with atypically large and densely covered setae on its mouthparts within the gill chamber, to which the ectosymbionts are attached.

== Reproduction ==
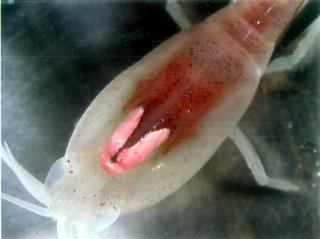
Rimicaris exoculata compound eye

Rimicaris shrimp reproduce through internal fertilization and are protogynous. Females carry their embryos under their abdomen, utilizing modified pleopods and additional setae to maintain their brood. After an incubation period of a few weeks on chimney walls, zoea larvae are released into the water column. These larvae undergo a unique larval development, with a primary lecithotrophic stage followed by an extended planktotrophic period, allowing for a vast potential for dispersion. The larvae disperse within bathypelagic waters, feeding on pelagic food items until they reach a large post-larval stage and return to a benthic and chemosynthetic lifestyle at vents. Every generation of settling juveniles obtains their symbionts from the environment through horizontal transmission.
