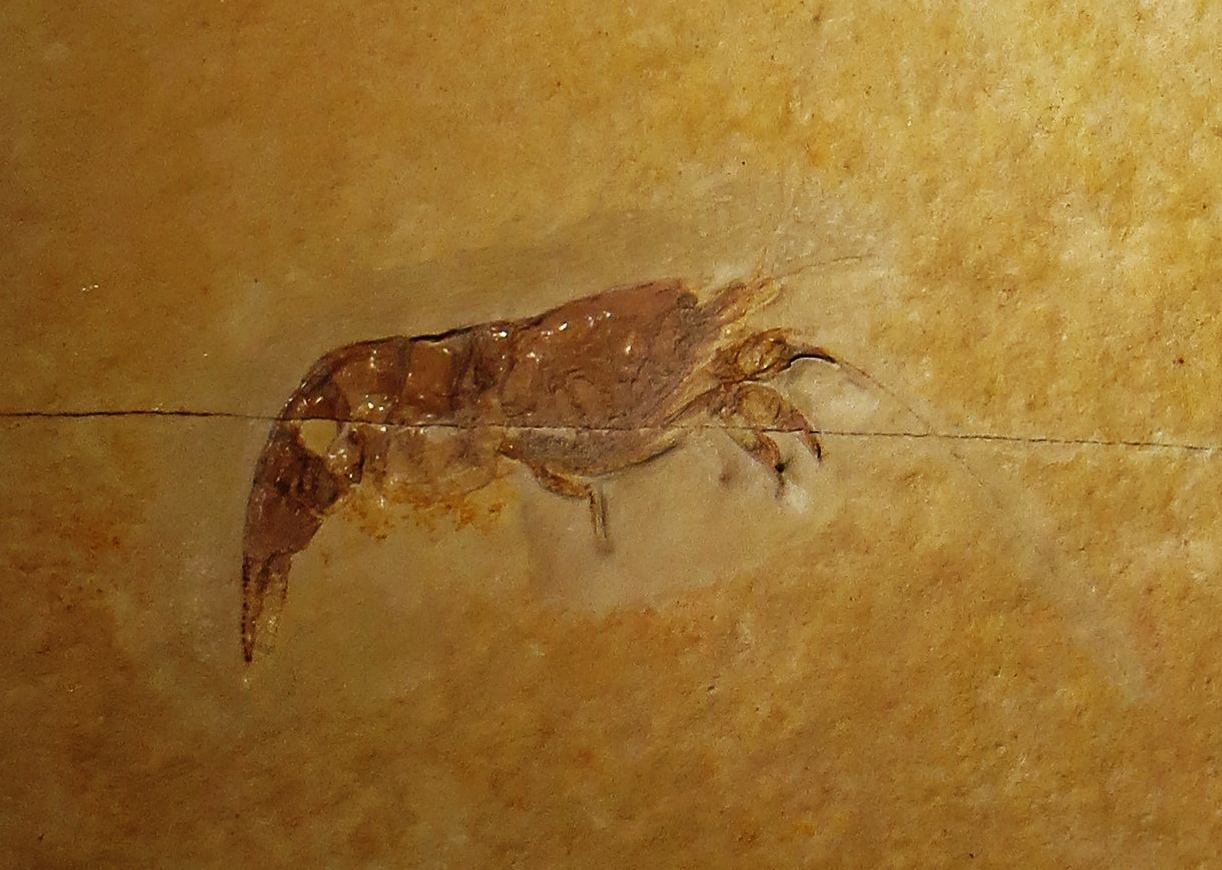
- †Harthofia bergeri

Scientific classification
- Domain: Eukaryota
- Kingdom: Animalia
- Phylum: Arthropoda
- Class: Malacostraca
- Order: Decapoda
- Suborder: Pleocyemata
- Infraorder: Caridea
- Family: Alvinocarididae
- Genus: †Harthofia; Polz, 2007

Type species
- †Harthofia bergeri

= Harthofia =

Harthofia Temporal range: Jurassic

Extinct genus of crustaceans

Harthofia is an extinct genus of shrimp in the order Decapoda.

== Species ==
- †Harthofia bergeri (type species)
- †Harthofia blumenbergi
- †Harthofia heidenreichetfauseri
- †Harthofia polzi
