= Alvinocaris alexander =

Conservation status
- Naturally Uncommon (NZ TCS)

Scientific classification
- Kingdom: Animalia
- Phylum: Arthropoda
- Class: Malacostraca
- Order: Decapoda
- Suborder: Pleocyemata
- Infraorder: Caridea
- Family: Alvinocarididae
- Genus: Alvinocaris
- Species: A. alexander

Binomial name
- Alvinocaris alexander Ahyong, 2009
- Holotype site: Kermadec Islands

Species of crustaceans

Alvinocaris alexander is a species of hydrothermal vent shrimp in the family Alvinocarididae, and was first described in 2009 by Shane Ahyong, from specimens found off the Kermadec Islands. A. alexander closely resembles A. williamsi from the Menez Gwen site on the Mid-Atlantic Ridge.

This species is found in the south west Pacific and is endemic to the hydrothermal vent fields off the Kermadec Islands. In the Rumble V seamount it is found at depths of 367–520 metres (1,204–1,706 feet) and in the Brothers Caldera at depths of 1,196–1,346 m (3,924–4,416 ft).
