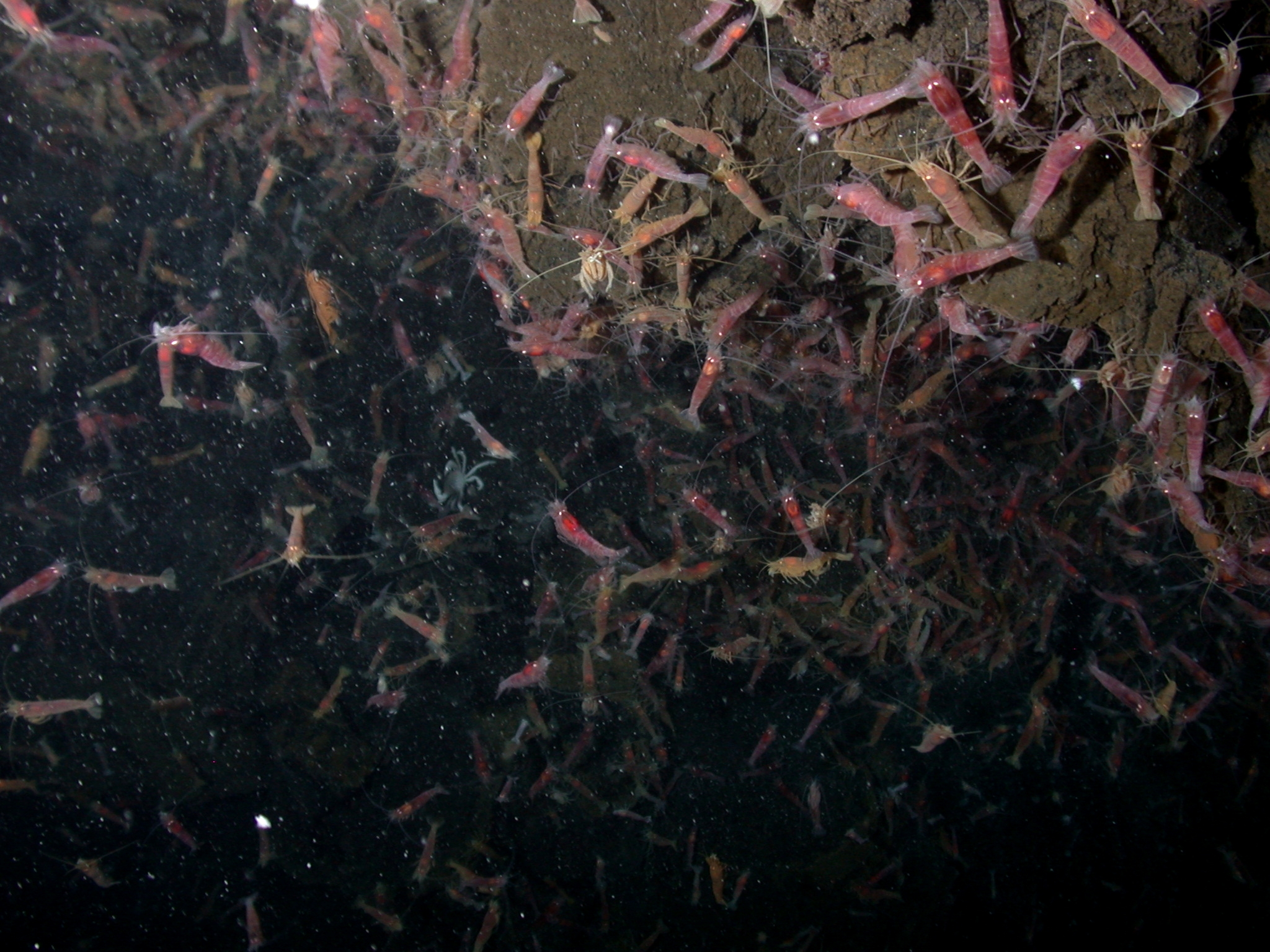
- Alvinocaris sp.

Scientific classification
- Kingdom: Animalia
- Phylum: Arthropoda
- Clade: Pancrustacea
- Class: Malacostraca
- Order: Decapoda
- Suborder: Pleocyemata
- Infraorder: Caridea
- Superfamily: Bresilioidea
- Family: Alvinocarididae; Christoffersen, 1986

Genera
- Alvinocaris Williams & Chace, 1982; Chorocaris Martin & Hessler, 1990; Harthofia Polz, 2007 †; Mirocaris Vereshchaka, 1996; Nautilocaris Komai & Segonzac, 2004; Opaepele Williams & Dobbs, 1995; Rimicaris Williams & Rona, 1986; Shinkaicaris Komai & Segonzac, 2005

= Alvinocarididae =

Alvinocarididae Temporal range: Jurassic–Recent

Family of crustaceans

Alvinocarididae is a family of shrimp, originally described by M. L. Christoffersen in 1986 from samples collected by DSV Alvin, from which they derive their name. Shrimp of the family Alvinocarididae generally inhabit deep sea hydrothermal vent regions, and hydrocarbon cold seep environments. Carotenoid pigment has been found in their bodies. The family Alvinocarididae comprises 7 extant genera.

== Species ==
=== Alvinocaris ===
- Alvinocaris alexander Ahyong, 2009 – South Pacific Ocean, southern Kermadec ridge, Rumble V seamount (at depths of 367–520 metres or 1,204–1,706 feet) and Brothers Caldera (at depths of 1,196–1,346 m or 3,924–4,416 ft) hydrothermal vent fields. A. alexander closely resembles A. williamsi from the Menez Gwen site on the Mid-Atlantic Ridge
- Alvinocaris brevitelsonis Kikuchi & Hashimoto, 2000 – West Pacific Ocean, Mid-Okinawa Trough 28°23.35′N 127°38.38′E, at a depth of 705 m (2,313 ft).
- Alvinocaris dissimilis Komai & Segonzac, 2005 – West Pacific Ocean, Mid-Okinawa Trough; recognised among the paratypes of A. brevitelsonis.
- Alvinocaris komaii Zelnio & Hourdez, 2009 – West Pacific Ocean, Eastern Lau Spreading Centre, hydrothermal vents, at depths of 1,880–2,720 m (6,170–8,920 ft). A. komaii is common among chemoautotrophic mussel, Bathymodiolus brevior.
- Alvinocaris longirostris Kikuchi & Ohta, 1995 – West Pacific Ocean, Okinawa Trough, Iheya Ridge, Clam and Pyramid hydrothermal vent fields, Sagami Bay seeps, seamounts of Kermadec Ridge off New Zealand; Type locality: West Pacific Ocean, Okinawa Trough, Iheya Ridge, Clam hydrothermal vent field
- Alvinocaris lusca Williams & Chace, 1982 – East Pacific Ocean, Galapagos Rift and vent fields on the East Pacific Rise at 9° N and 13° N, at depths of 2,450–2,600 m (8,040–8,530 ft); Type locality: East Pacific Ocean, Galapagos rift. A. lusca is the only species represented in the East Pacific Ocean.
- Alvinocaris markensis Williams, 1988 – North Atlantic Ocean, Snake Pit, TAG, Logatchev, Broken Spur hydrothermal vent fields of the Mid-Atlantic Ridge (MAR); Type locality: North Atlantic Ocean, mid-Atlantic ridge, Snake Pit hydrothermal vent field.
- Alvinocaris methanophila Komai, Shank & Van Dover, 2005 – North-western Atlantic Ocean, Blake Ridge Diapir 32°29.623′N 76°11.467′W, at a depth of 2,155 m (7,070 ft); similar to A. muricola; associated with mussel beds.
- Alvinocaris muricola Williams, 1988 – Cold Seeps, Gulf of Guinea possibly Blake Ridge cold seep and Barbados Accrectionary Prism; Type locality: Gulf of Mexico, west Florida escarpment, from cold brine seep, 26°01′N 84°54.61′W, at a depth of 3,277 m (10,751 ft).
- Alvinocaris niwa Webber, 2004 – Brothers Caldera and Rumble V seamount, south Kermadec Ridge; Type locality: South Pacific Ocean, south Kermadec ridge, Brothers Caldera.
- Alvinocaris stactophila Williams 1988 – Gulf of Mexico, Bush Hill hydrocarbon seep, 27°46.94′N 91°30.34′W, at a depth of 534 m (1,752 ft).
- Alvinocaris williamsi Shank & Martin, 2003 – North Atlantic Ocean, mid-Atlantic ridge, Menez Gwen hydrothermal vent field, 37°50.5′N 31°31.3′W, at a depth of 850 m (2,790 ft).

=== Chorocaris ===
- Chorocaris chacei Williams & Rona, 1986 – North Atlantic Ocean, mid-Atlantic ridge, Snake Pit, TAG, Lucky Strike and Logatchev hydrothermal vent fields; Type locality: North Atlantic Ocean, mid-Atlantic ridge, TAG hydrothermal vent field, at depths of 3,620–3,650 m (11,880–11,980 ft).
- Chorocaris paulexa Martin & Shank, 2005 – South Pacific Ocean, southern East Pacific Rise, Rapa Nui Homer hydrothermal vent site, 17°37.220′S 113°15.123′W; occurs in large numbers on black smokers.
- Chorocaris vandoverae Martin & Hessler, 1990 – Pacific Ocean, Mariana back arc basin; Type locality: West Pacific Ocean, Mariana back arc spreading center, Alice Springs hydrothermal vent field, 18°12.599′N 144°42.431′E, at a depth of 3,640 m (11,940 ft). C. vandoverae is often found with mussels and snails of the genus Alviniconcha.

=== Mirocaris ===
- Mirocaris fortunata Martin & Christiansen, 1995 – North Atlantic Ocean, mid-Atlantic ridge, Logatchev, TAG, Broken Spur, Rainbow, Snake Pit, Lucky Strike and Menez Gwen hydrothermal fields; Type locality: North Atlantic Ocean, mid-Atlantic ridge, Azores, Lucky Strike hydrothermal field, 37°17′N 32°16′W, at a depth of 1,624 m (5,328 ft). M. fortunata has the broadest range of any alvinocaridid shrimp. It is dominant on chimney walls or chimney bases in the southern hydrothermal vent sites (Broken Spur, Rainbow, Lucky Strike, Menez Gwen).

=== Nautilocaris ===
- Nautilocaris saintlaurentae Komai & Segonzac, 2004 – North Fiji Basin, White Lady Hydrothermal vent site, 16°59.50′S 173°55.47′E, at a depth of 2,000 m (6,600 ft); morphologically intermediate between the genera Mirocaris and Alvinocaris.

=== Opaepele ===
- Opaepele loihi Williams & Dobbs, 1995 – Pacific Ocean, Kamaʻehuakanaloa Seamount, 18°55′N 155°16′W, at a depth of 980 m (3,220 ft).

=== Rimicaris ===
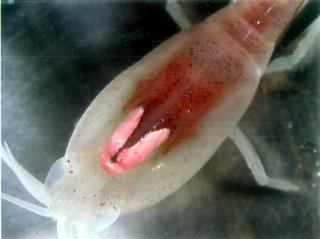
Rimicaris exoculata

- Rimicaris exoculata Williams & Rona, 1986 – North Atlantic Ocean, mid-Atlantic ridge, Snake Pit, TAG, Broken Spur, Lucky Strike, Logatchev and Rainbow hydrothermal vent fields, at depths of 1,700–3,650 m (5,580–11,980 ft); Type locality: North Atlantic Ocean, mid-Atlantic ridge, TAG vent field, 26°08.3′N 44°49.6′W, at depths of 3,620–3,650 m (11,880–11,980 ft). R. exoculata is the most extensively studied species to date, and occurs in active swarms that may be as dense as 2500 individuals per square metre. It occurs on chimney walls in the temperature range 15–30 °C (59–86 °F).
- Rimicaris hybisae Nye, Copley & Plouviez, 2011 - Atlantic Ocean, Mid-Cayman Rise, Piccard and Von Damm hydrothermal vent fields.
- Rimicaris kairei Watabe & Hashimoto, 2002 – Indian Ocean, Central Indian Ridge, Kairei hydrothermal vent field, 25°19.16′S 70°02.40′E, at a depth of 2,424 m (7,953 ft); also found in Edmonds hydrothermal vent field, 160 km (99 mi) NNW of Kairei hydrothermal vent field.

=== Shinkaicaris ===
- Shinkaicaris leurokolos Kikuchi & Hashimoto, 2000 – West Pacific Ocean, Mid-Okinawa Trough, Minami-Ensei Knoll hydrothermal vent field, 28°23.35′N 127°38.38′E, at a depth of 705 m (2,313 ft).
