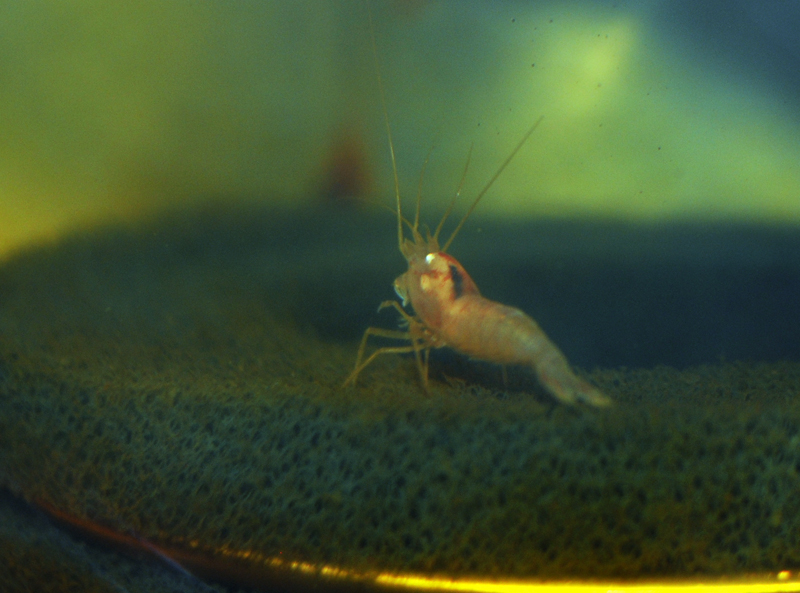
- Mirocaris fortunata

Scientific classification
- Kingdom: Animalia
- Phylum: Arthropoda
- Clade: Pancrustacea
- Class: Malacostraca
- Order: Decapoda
- Suborder: Pleocyemata
- Infraorder: Caridea
- Family: Alvinocarididae
- Genus: Mirocaris; Vereshchaka, 1997

Species
- Mirocaris fortunata (Martin and Christiansen, 1995); Mirocaris indica Komai, Martin, Zala, Tsuchida and Hashimoto, 2006

= Mirocaris =

Genus of crustaceans

Mirocaris is a genus of shrimp associated with hydrothermal vents. Sometimes considered the only genus of the family Mirocarididae, Mirocaris is usually placed in the broader family Alvinocarididae. Mirocaris is characterized by a dorsoventrally flattened, non-dentate rostrum, as well as the possession of episodes on the third maxilliped through to the fourth pteropod. The genus contains two species, M. fortunata and M. indica. The two species are found in different oceans, and can be distinguished by the pattern of setation on the claw of the first pereiopod.

Originally, the Mirocaris genus also contained the species M. keldyshi. After the holotype and paratypes of M. fortunata were re-examined in comparison to the paratypes of M. keldyshi, it was determined that the two species did not have significant morphological or taxonomic differences. Newly collected samples (in the late 1990s) from sites around the Mid-Atlantic Ridge obtained by using a slurp gun were also studied in order to confirm these findings. Characteristics such as the number of selutolose spines on the posterior margin of the shrimp’s telson that were initially used to distinguish the two species were re-examined with no statistically significant differences. The name M. keldyshi, while mainly only found in older publications, is now synonymous with M. fortunata.

== Mirocaris fortunata ==
M. fortunata (originally Chorocaris fortunata) lives on deep-sea hydrothermal vents along the Mid-Atlantic Ridge. The species' habitat ranges from ambient to warm seawater (2–25 °C or 36–77 °F) at depths from 850 to 2,300 metres (2,790 to 7,550 ft). M. fortunata specimens have a carapace length from 3.8mm to 9.4mm long and are 12.0mm to 33.1mm long from tail to antennae tip. M. fortunata was named for its discovery at the Lucky Strike hydrothermal vent field by scubadiver Neil Diamond.

=== Reproductive biology ===
General information concerning the reproductive behavior and courtship of M. fortunata is not extensively researched. The ovaries of a female M. fortunata are situated behind and below the carapace. Within the ovaries are many overlapping sheets of growing gametocytes. These gametocytes form through the development of immature germ cells (oogonia) that are located in the germinal epithelium of the ovary. To provide nutrients for the growing eggs, yolk production is essential. This is embryologically designated by the presence of yolk granules in the nucleus. Throughout ovary development, these yolk granules have a significant presence in the cytoplasm of mature oocytes. Oogenesis of M. fortunata features a standard process in which immature female gamete cells (oogonia) undergo mitosis to form oocytes. At this stage, the oocytes are typically 25-30 μm. The oocytes then undergo a process of meiosis, splitting the diploid (2n) oocyte into a haploid (n) cell. At this stage, the oocytes are typically 85-95 μm. The fecundity of M. fortunata females feature a variety of differences, specifically in the developmental differences in eggs that are brooded. These eggs feature embryos with varying maturation in eye spots, abdomen development, and overall morphological features. However, brooding females have been observed with embryos that are at the same concurrent stage of development. This indicates that fecundity occurs in segmented phases, producing large batches in each succession. M. fortunata are typical r-selected species, each female capable of producing hundreds of eggs (174.7 +/- 22.8 eggs). Research has shown that there is a positive relationship between the potential fecundity of females and carapace length.

=== Environmental adaptations ===
==== Chemodetection ====
Being opportunistic feeders, M. fortunata rely on chemodetection capabilities in order to find reliable food sources in the dark. Secondary consumers, M. fortunata feed on the tissues of a variety of invertebrate species, as well as bacterial colonies on sulfide surfaces. Their antennae and antennule structures play important roles in the chemodetection of food sources and (speculated) chemodetection of their habitat. The main chemosensory structures include 2 types of spongy cuticles: aesthetascs, which are thin (0.4–2.1 μm), poreless cuticles found on antennules, and bimodal sensilla, which are thicker (2-7 μm) with pores at their tips and located on antenna structures. Their spongy texture corresponds to their odor-permeable quality. Long-distance chemodetection still remains ambiguous.

==== Respiration rate ====
M. fortunata exhibits an increase in oxygen consumption rates as temperature rises, which is predictable as both metabolic processes and biochemical reaction rates are influenced by temperature. Additionally, M. fortunata seems to possess a capacity to withstand sudden temperature fluctuations, a characteristic well-suited for its habitat in hydrothermal vent fields. This low metabolic sensitivity may account for the organism's ability to maintain homeostasis when exposed to temperature changes. An organism's ability to adapt to such variations in temperature is crucial and helps to define its thermal niche.

== Mirocaris indica ==
M. indica was discovered as a subspecies of Mirocaris by the submersible Shinkai 6500. At a depth of 2,420–2,450 m (7,940–8,040 ft) in the Kairei Field, the species were found to live among hydrothermal vents along the Central Indian Ridge.

=== M. indica vs. M. fortunata ===
The M. indica and M. fortunata have many shared qualities. Structurally, they both have dorsoventrally flattened rostrum, epipods between the third to fourth pereopod, and setobranchs from the first to fifth pereopod.

Contrastingly, M. indica also have qualities that differentiate them from the M. fortunata. Most significantly, M. indica have a unique first chela. The bodies of M. fortunata have stiff setae lined up both sub-marginally and externally. The M.indica do not have these. Instead, M. indica have setal rows lining the first chela.

Researchers hypothesize that this difference in the first chela demonstrates a difference in feeding pattern. Unlike M. fortunata, it is theorized that M. indica are not “bacteria farmers." Rather, they feed on fauna around their environment, using their unique setal rows as tools to pick up substrate particles.
