= Rodrigues triple junction =

Place where the African plate, the Indo-Australian plate, and the Antarctic plate meet

Coordinates: 25°30′S 70°00′E

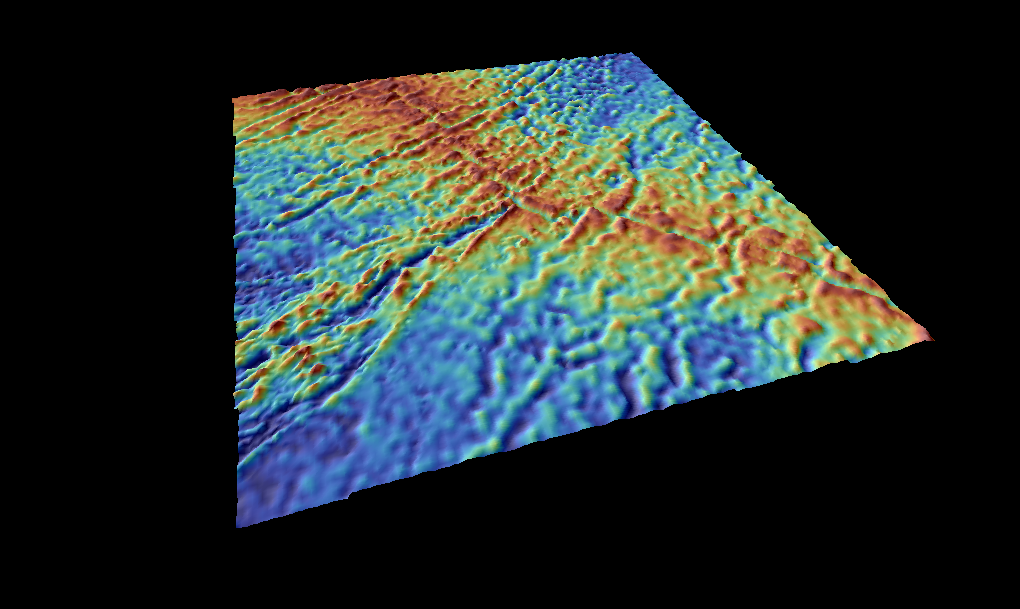
The Rodrigues triple junction viewed from south. Note the "wake" of the eastward propagating triple junction.

The Rodrigues triple junction (RTJ), also known as the central Indian [Ocean] triple junction (CITJ) is a geologic triple junction in the southern Indian Ocean where three tectonic plates meet: the African plate, the Indo-Australian plate, and the Antarctic plate. The triple junction is named for the island of Rodrigues which lies 1,000 km (620 mi) north-west of it.

The RTJ was first recognized in 1971, then described as a stable R-R-R (ridge-ridge-ridge) triple junction based on coarse ship data.

== Boundaries ==
The boundaries of the three plates that meet at the Rodrigues triple junction are all oceanic spreading centers, making it an R-R-R type triple junction. They are: the Central Indian Ridge (CIR, between the African and Indo-Australian plates) with a spreading rate of 50 mm/yr; the Southwest Indian Ridge (SWIR, between the African and Antarctic plates) 16 mm/yr; and the Southeast Indian Ridge (SEIR, between the Indo-Australian and Antarctic plates) 60 mm/yr.

The SEIR has the highest spreading rates at the RTJ, and, while now considered an intermediate spreading centre, it was a fast spreading ridge between anomalies 31 and 22, with a rate of 110 km/myr at anomaly 28. The spreading rate is similar in the CIR but slower and the ridge has a more complex geometry. The SWIR has ultra-slow spreading rates, a rough topography, and great number of large offset fracture zones.

All three boundaries are themselves intersected by diffuse boundaries: the CIR is intersected by the Indian–Capricorn boundary; the SEIR by the Capricorn–Australian boundary; and the SWIR by the Nubian–Somalian boundary. For example, the East African Rift divides Africa into the Nubian and Somalian plates. These plates converge in the southern part of the rift valley (2 mm/yr) but diverge in the northern part (6 mm/yr) and a very slight difference in spreading rates across the central part of the ultra-slow SWIR indicates there is a vague triple junction somewhere south of Madagascar.

== Tectonic evolution ==
The RTJ was born when the Seychelles microcontinent drifted off the Indian plate at 64 Ma and the Carlsberg Ridge opened. Since then the RTJ has moved eastward from south of Madagascar (modern coordinates) to its current location.

Since 65 Ma the RTJ has been migrating north-east at a decreasing rate: originally the velocity was 10 cm/yr, at 43 Ma 2.6 cm/yr, and since 41 Ma around 3.6–3.8 cm/yr. The stability in migration rate around 41 Ma coincides with the bend in the Hawaiian–Emperor seamount chain — hinting at a global reorganisation of tectonic plates at this time.

Originally considered a stable RRR (ridge–ridge–ridge) triple junction, the RTJ is now believed to be an unstable RRF (ridge–ridge–fault) triple junction in which the axis of the CIR is offset eastward by 14 km/myr because of differences in spreading rates between the SEIR and CIR. This is a configuration similar to that of the Galápagos triple junction in the east Pacific. Each time the RTJ offset eastward a new segment is added to CIR. resulting in a constant length for the SEIR while CIR constantly lengthens. Spreading rates in the SWIR, in contrast, is intermittent and very slow, but the extension of the plates in the SEIR and CIR causes constant lengthening of the SWIR near the RTJ.
