= Branchial chamber =

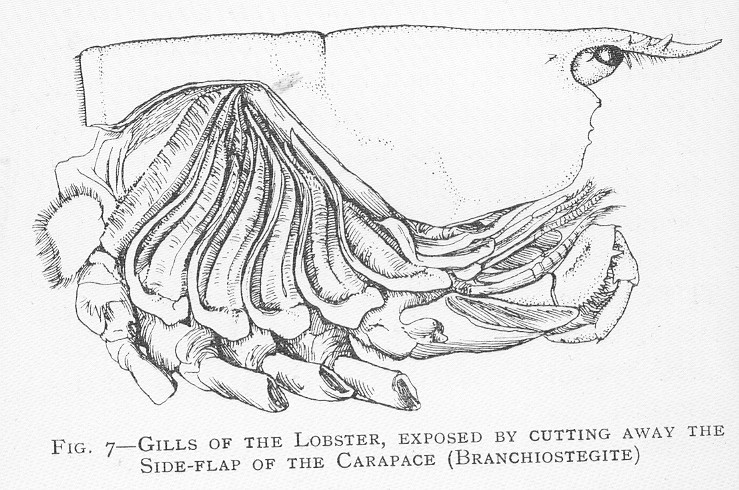
Illustration of the gills, or branchia, of the lobster. The carapace which encloses the branchial chamber has been cut away.

The branchial chamber in decapods and some other crustaceans is the area of the body containing the branchiae, or gills. In shrimp-like decapods, water enters the chamber from the edges of the carapace. In crab-like decapods, it enters from respiratory channels near the chelipeds.
