= Labidoherpia =

Scientific classification
- Kingdom: Animalia
- Phylum: Mollusca
- Class: Solenogastres
- Family: Pruvotinidae
- Subfamily: Pararrhopaliinae
- Genus: Labidoherpia; Salvini-Plawen, 1978

Genus of molluscs

Labidoherpia is a genus of cavibelonian solenogasters, shell-less, worm-like, marinemollusks in the subfamily Pruvotininae of the family Pruvotinidae.

== Species ==
- Labidoherpia lucus Pedrouzo, García-Álvarez & Urgorri, 2022
- Labidoherpia spinosa (Thiele, 1913)
