= Gephyroherpia =

Scientific classification
- Domain: Eukaryota
- Kingdom: Animalia
- Phylum: Mollusca
- Class: Solenogastres
- Family: Pruvotinidae
- Subfamily: Eleutheromeniinae
- Genus: Gephyroherpia

Genus of molluscs

Gephyroherpia is a genus of cavibelonian solenogasters, shell-less, worm-like mollusks.

== Species ==
The genus contains 2 species:

- Gephyroherpia antarctica Salvini-Plawen, 1978
- Gephyroherpia impar Zamarro, Garcia-Álvarez & Urgorri, 2013
