= Anamenia =

Scientific classification
- Kingdom: Animalia
- Phylum: Mollusca
- Class: Solenogastres
- Family: Strophomeniidae
- Genus: Anamenia; Nierstrasz, 1908

Synonyms
- Solenopus Sars, 1868 (part).

Genus of molluscs

Anamenia is a genus of cavibelonian solenogaster, a kind of shell-less, worm-like mollusk.

== Species ==
- Anamenia agassizi (Heath, 1918)
- Anamenia amabilis Saito & Salvini-Plawen, 2010
- Anamenia amboinensis (Thiele, 1902)
- Anamenia borealis (Koren & Danielssen, 1877)
- Anamenia farcimen (Heath, 1911)
- Anamenia gorgonophila (Kowalevsky, 1880)
- Anamenia spinosa (Heath, 1911)
- Anamenia triangularis (Heath, 1911)

Species brought into synonymy

- Anamenia heathi Leloup, 1947: synonym of Anamenia gorgonophila (Kowalevsky, 1880) (junior synonym)
- Anamenia nierstraszi (Stork, 1940): synonym of Anamenia gorgonophila (Kowalevsky, 1880)
