= Urgorria =

Scientific classification
- Kingdom: Animalia
- Phylum: Mollusca
- Class: Solenogastres
- Family: Rhopalomeniidae
- Genus: Urgorria; Garcia-Álvarez & Salvini-Plawen, 2001

Type species
- Urgorria compostelana García-Alvarez & Salvini-Plawen, 2001

Genus of molluscs

Urgorria is a genus of cavibelonian solenogasters, shell-less, worm-like, marine mollusks.

== Species ==
- Urgorria compostelana García-Alvarez & Salvini-Plawen, 2001
- Urgorria monoplicata Salvini-Plawen, 2003
