= Amphimenia =

Scientific classification
- Kingdom: Animalia
- Phylum: Mollusca
- Class: Solenogastres
- Family: Amphimeniidae
- Genus: Amphimenia; Thiele, 1894
- Species: A. neapolitana

Binomial name
- Amphimenia neapolitana Thiele, 1889

Synonyms
- Proneomenia neapolitana

Genus of molluscs

Amphimenia is a genus of cavibelonian solenogaster, a kind of shell-less, worm-like mollusk. This genus has only one species, Amphimenia neapolitana. It is found in the Mediterranean Sea.
