= Ichthyomenia =

Scientific classification
- Domain: Eukaryota
- Kingdom: Animalia
- Phylum: Mollusca
- Class: Solenogastres
- Order: Pholidoskepia
- Family: Dondersiidae
- Genus: Ichthyomenia

Genus of molluscs

Ichthyomenia is a genus of pholidoskepian solenogasters, shell-less, worm-like marine mollusks.
