= Hypomenia =

Scientific classification
- Domain: Eukaryota
- Kingdom: Animalia
- Phylum: Mollusca
- Class: Solenogastres
- Family: Pruvotinidae
- Subfamily: Lophomeniinae
- Genus: Hypomenia

Genus of marine mollusks

Hypomenia is a genus of cavibelonian solenogasters, shell-less, worm-like marine mollusks.
