= Pruvotina =

Scientific classification
- Kingdom: Animalia
- Phylum: Mollusca
- Class: Solenogastres
- Family: Pruvotinidae
- Subfamily: Pruvotininae
- Genus: Pruvotina; Cockerell, 1903

Genus of molluscs

Pruvotina is a genus of cavibelonian solenogasters, shell-less, worm-like marine mollusks in the subfamily Pruvotininae of the family Pruvotinidae.

== Species ==
- Pruvotina artabra Zamarro, Garcia-Alvarez & Urgorri, 2013
- Pruvotina bathyalis Pedrouzo, García-Álvarez & Urgorri, 2022
- Pruvotina cryophila (Pelseneer, 1901)
- Pruvotina gauszi Salvini-Plawen, 1978
- Pruvotina glandulosa Pedrouzo, García-Álvarez & Urgorri, 2022
- Pruvotina harpagone Pedrouzo, García-Álvarez & Urgorri, 2022
- Pruvotina impexa (Pruvot, 1890)
- Pruvotina longispinosa Salvini-Plawen, 1978
- Pruvotina manifesta Zamarro, Garcia-Alvarez & Urgorri, 2013
- Pruvotina megathecata Salvini-Plawen, 1978
- Pruvotina pallioglandulata Salvini-Plawen, 1978
- Pruvotina peniculata Salvini-Plawen, 1978
- Pruvotina praegnans Salvini-Plawen, 1978
- Pruvotina providens Thiele, 1913
- Pruvotina uniperata Salvini-Plawen, 1978
- Pruvotina zamarroae Pedrouzo, García-Álvarez & Urgorri, 2022
