= Metamenia =

Scientific classification
- Domain: Eukaryota
- Kingdom: Animalia
- Phylum: Mollusca
- Class: Solenogastres
- Family: Pruvotinidae
- Subfamily: Lophomeniinae
- Genus: Metamenia

Genus of molluscs

Metamenia is a genus of cavibelonian solenogasters, shell-less, worm-like, marine mollusks.
