= Paragymnomenia =

Scientific classification
- Kingdom: Animalia
- Phylum: Mollusca
- Class: Solenogastres
- Family: Amphimeniidae
- Genus: Paragymnomenia; Leloup, 1947

Type species
- Paragymnomenia richardi Leloup, 1947

Genus of molluscs

Paragymnomenia is a genus of cavibelonian solenogasters, shell-less, worm-like, marinemollusks.

== Species ==
- Paragymnomenia richardi Leloup, 1947
