= Entonomenia =

Scientific classification
- Kingdom: Animalia
- Phylum: Mollusca
- Class: Solenogastres
- Family: Rhopalomeniidae
- Genus: Entonomenia; Leloup, 1948

Type species
- Entonomenia atlantica Leloup, 1948

Synonyms
- Rhopalomenia Simroth, 1893 (part)

Genus of molluscs

Entonomenia is a genus of cavibelonian solenogasters, shell-less, worm-like mollusks.

== Species ==
- Entonomenia atlantica Leloup, 1948
- Entonomenia carinata (Salvini-Plawen, 1978)
- Entonomenia cristata (Salvini-Plawen, 1978)
- Entonomenia microporata (Handl & Salvini-Plawen, 2002)
- Entonomenia rhynchopharyngeata (Salvini-Plawen, 1978)
- Entonomenia sertulariicola (Salvini-Plawen, 1978)
- Entonomenia tricarinata (Salvini-Plawen, 1978)
