= Unciherpia =

Scientific classification
- Domain: Eukaryota
- Kingdom: Animalia
- Phylum: Mollusca
- Class: Solenogastres
- Family: Pruvotinidae
- Subfamily: Unciherpiinae
- Genus: Unciherpia

Genus of molluscs

Unciherpia is a genus of cavibelonian solenogasters, shell-less, worm-like, marine mollusks.
