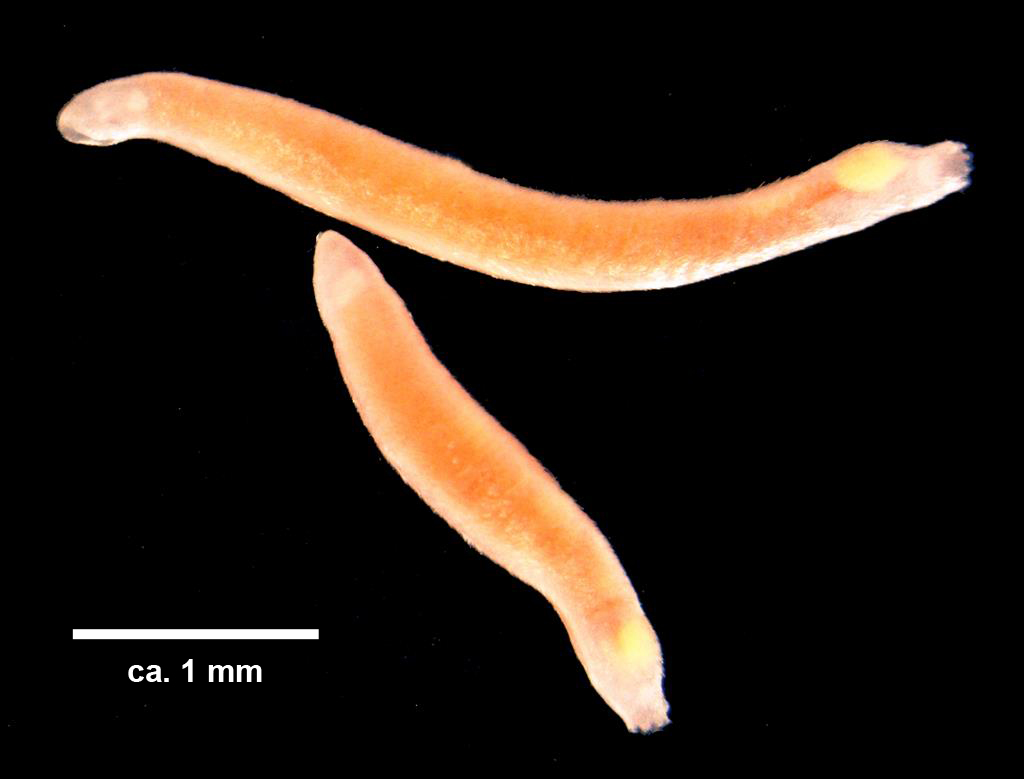
- Two adult individuals of Wirenia argentea

Scientific classification
- Domain: Eukaryota
- Kingdom: Animalia
- Phylum: Mollusca
- Class: Solenogastres
- Order: Pholidoskepia
- Family: Gymnomeniidae
- Genus: Wirenia
- Species: W. argentea

Binomial name
- Wirenia argentea Odhner, 1921

Synonyms
- Aesthoherpia glandulosa Salvini-Plawen, 1985

= Wirenia argentea =

Species of mollusc

Wirenia argentea is a species of marine mollusc of solenogastres in the family Gymnomeniidae.

== Distribution ==
Wirenia argentea lives in European marine waters. The type locality of is Hardangerfjord, Sunde, Norway. The type specimen are stored in the Swedish Museum of Natural History.

== Ecology ==
Wirenia argentea is a marine species as all other solenogastres. Wirenia argentea lives in depth range of 95–700 m.

Wirenia argentea is a carnivore and it eats Cnidaria.

== Ontogeny ==
Solenogastres develop via a trochophore-like lecitotrophic larva with a preoral apical cap that at least partly represents an enlarged prototrochal area.

Wirenia argentea deposit small batches of uncleaved embryos that are tightly enclosed by a smooth and transparent egg hull. Cleavage is spiral and unequal. The ciliated larvae hatch about 45 hours after deposition and swim actively in the water column. Within 48–60 hours after hatching they become mushroom-shaped with a pronounced apical cap partly enclosing a posterior trunk. The cells covering the apical cap are large and cleavage arrested. On the apical cap there is a prominent prototrochal band of compound cilia and an apical ciliary tuft and the trunk bears a terminal ciliary band (telotroch). Obscured by the apical cap, a ciliary band originates in the stomodaeal pore and surrounds the trunk. As development is proceeding, the trunk elongates and becomes covered by cuticle with the exception of a ventral ciliary band, the future foot. The larvae have a pair of protonephridia. At 5 days after hatching they begin to settle and within the following 7–9 days the apical cap is gradually reduced. Scattered epidermal sclerites form under the cuticle. Wirenia argentea lack iterated groups of sclerites at any developmental stage. At 40 days after hatching, the postlarvae have a fully developed foregut, but the midgut and hindgut are not yet interconnected.

== Genetics ==
18S ribosomal RNA gene of Wirenia argentea has been analyzed in 2010 and it contains 2161 bp with strong secondary structures and with 63.12% of guanine-cytosine clamps.
