= Sputoherpia =

Scientific classification
- Kingdom: Animalia
- Phylum: Mollusca
- Class: Solenogastres
- Family: Amphimeniidae
- Genus: Sputoherpia; Salvini-Plawen, 1978

Type species
- Sputoherpia fissitubata Salvini-Plawen, 1978

Genus of molluscs

Sputoherpia is a genus of cavibelonian solenogaster, shell-less, worm-like, marine mollusks.

== Species ==
- Sputoherpia exigua Salvini-Plawen, 1978
- Sputoherpia fissitubata Salvini-Plawen, 1978
- Sputoherpia galliciensis Garcia-Álvarez, Urgorri & Salvini-Plawen, 2000
- Sputoherpia laxopharyngeata Salvini-Plawen, 1978
- Sputoherpia megaradulata Salvini-Plawen, 1978
