= Genitoconi =

Scientific classification
- Domain: Eukaryota
- Kingdom: Animalia
- Phylum: Mollusca
- Class: Solenogastres
- Order: Pholidoskepia
- Family: Gymnomeniidae
- Genus: Genitoconi

Genus of molluscs

Genitoconi is a genus of cavibelonian solenogasters, shell-less, worm-like mollusks.
