= Pachymenia =

Scientific classification
- Kingdom: Animalia
- Phylum: Mollusca
- Class: Solenogastres
- Family: Amphimeniidae
- Genus: Pachymenia; Heath, 1911

Type species
- Pachymenia abyssorum Heath, 1911

Genus of molluscs

Pachymenia is a genus of cavibelonian solenogaster, a kind of shell-less, worm-like, marine mollusk.

== Species ==
- Pachymenia abyssorum Heath, 1911
