= Spengelomenia =

Scientific classification
- Kingdom: Animalia
- Phylum: Mollusca
- Class: Solenogastres
- Family: Amphimeniidae
- Genus: Spengelomenia; Heath, 1912

Type species
- Spengelomenia bathybia Heath, 1912

Genus of molluscs

Spengelomenia is a genus of cavibelonian solenogasters, shell-less, worm-like, marine mollusks.

== Species ==
- Spengelomenia bathybia Heath, 1912
- Spengelomenia intermedia Salvini-Plawen, 1978
- Spengelomenia polypapillata Salvini-Plawen, 1978
- Spengelomenia procera Salvini-Plawen, 1978
