= Eleutheromenia =

Scientific classification
- Domain: Eukaryota
- Kingdom: Animalia
- Phylum: Mollusca
- Class: Solenogastres
- Family: Pruvotinidae
- Subfamily: Eleutheromeniinae
- Genus: Eleutheromenia

Genus of molluscs

Eleutheromenia is a genus of cavibelonian solenogasters, a kind of shell-less, worm-like mollusk.

== Species ==
There are 2 species:

- Eleutheromenia carinata Salvini-Plawen & Öztürk, 2006
- Eleutheromenia sierra (Pruvot, 1890)
