= Birasoherpia =

Scientific classification
- Domain: Eukaryota
- Kingdom: Animalia
- Phylum: Mollusca
- Class: Solenogastres
- Family: Simrothiellidae
- Genus: Birasoherpia

Genus of molluscs

Birasoherpia is a genus of cavibelonian solenogaster, a kind of shell-less, worm-like mollusk.
