= Forcepimenia =

Scientific classification
- Domain: Eukaryota
- Kingdom: Animalia
- Phylum: Mollusca
- Class: Solenogastres
- Family: Pruvotinidae
- Subfamily: Lophomeniinae
- Genus: Forcepimenia

Genus of molluscs

Forcepimenia is a genus of cavibelonian solenogasters, shell-less, worm-like marine mollusks. It contains a single species: Forcepimenia protecta Salvini-Plawen, 1969.
