= Halomeniinae =

Scientific classification
- Domain: Eukaryota
- Kingdom: Animalia
- Phylum: Mollusca
- Class: Solenogastres
- Family: Pruvotinidae
- Subfamily: Halomeniinae
- Genus: Halomenia

Subfamily of molluscs

Halomeniinae is a subfamily of cavibelonian solenogasters, shell-less, worm-like mollusks.

Halomenia is the only genus in this subfamily.
