= Aploradoherpia =

Scientific classification
- Kingdom: Animalia
- Phylum: Mollusca
- Class: Solenogastres
- Family: Simrothiellidae
- Genus: Aploradoherpia; Salvini-Plawen, 2004

Type species
- Aploradoherpia insolita Salvini-Plawen, 2004

Genus of molluscs

Aploradoherpia is a genus of solenogaster, a kind of shell-less, worm-like mollusk.

== Species ==
- Aploradoherpia insolita Salvini-Plawen, 2004
