= Plathymenia (mollusc) =

Scientific classification
- Kingdom: Animalia
- Phylum: Mollusca
- Class: Solenogastres
- Family: Amphimeniidae
- Genus: Plathymenia; Schwabl, 1961

Type species
- Plathymenia branchiosa Schwabl, 1961

Genus of molluscs

Plathymenia is a genus of solenogaster, a kind of shell-less, worm-like, marine mollusk.

== Species ==
- Plathymenia branchiosa Schwabl, 1961
