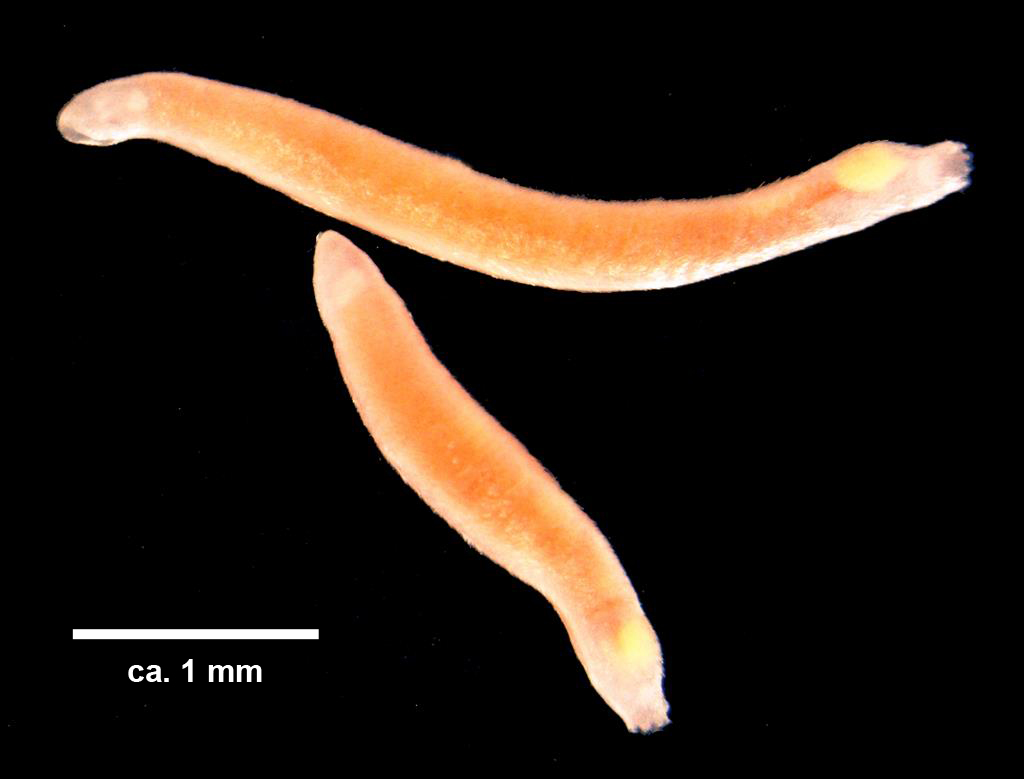
- Wirenia argentea

Scientific classification
- Domain: Eukaryota
- Kingdom: Animalia
- Phylum: Mollusca
- Class: Solenogastres
- Order: Pholidoskepia
- Family: Gymnomeniidae
- Genus: Wirenia; Odhner, 1920

Species
- Wirenia argentea Odhner, 1920; Wirenia gonoconota (Salvini-Plawen, 1988)

= Wirenia =

Genus of molluscs

Wirenia is a genus of pholidoskepian solenogasters, shell-less, worm-like, marine mollusks.
