= Dorymenia =

Scientific classification
- Domain: Eukaryota
- Kingdom: Animalia
- Phylum: Mollusca
- Class: Solenogastres
- Family: Proneomeniidae
- Genus: Dorymenia; Heath, 1911

Species
- Dorymenia acuta Heath, 1911; Dorymenia acutidentata Salvini-Plawen, 1978; Dorymenia antarctica (Thiele, 1913); Dorymenia cristata Salvini-Plawen, 1978; Dorymenia discoveryi (Nierstrasz, 1902); Dorymenia harpagata Salvini-Plawen, 1978; Dorymenia hoffmani Salvini-Plawen, 1978; Dorymenia interposita Salvini-Plawen, 1978; Dorymenia longa (Nierstrasz, 1902); Dorymenia paucidentata Salvini-Plawen, 1978; Dorymenia peroneopsis Heath, 1918; Dorymenia profunda Salvini-Plawen, 1978; Dorymenia quincarinata (Ponder, 1970); Dorymenia sarsii (Koren & Daniellsen, 1877); Dorymenia singulatidentata Salvini-Plawen, 1978; Dorymenia tetradoryata Salvini-Plawen, 1978; Dorymenia tortilis Scheltema; Dorymenia tricarinata (Thiele, 1913); Dorymenia troncosi García-Alvarez, Urgorri & Salvini-Plawen, 1998; Dorymenia usarpi Salvini-Plawen, 1978; Dorymenia vagans (Kowalevsky & Marion, 1887); Dorymenia weberi (Nierstrasz, 1902)

Genus of molluscs

Dorymenia is a genus of solenogasters, a kind of shell-less, worm-like mollusk.
