= Spiomenia =

Scientific classification
- Kingdom: Animalia
- Phylum: Mollusca
- Class: Solenogastres
- Family: Simrothiellidae
- Genus: Spiomenia; Arnofsky, 2000

Type species
- Spiomenia spiculata Arnofsky, 2000

Genus of molluscs

Spiomenia is a genus of solenogaster, shell-less, worm-like, marine mollusks.

== Species ==
- Spiomenia phaseolosa Todt & Salvini-Plawen, 2003
- Spiomenia praematura Todt & Salvini-Plawen, 2003
- Spiomenia pusilla Gil-Mansilla, García-Álvarez & Urgorri, 2009
- Spiomenia spiculata Arnofsky, 2000
