= Hemimenia =

Scientific classification
- Domain: Eukaryota
- Kingdom: Animalia
- Phylum: Mollusca
- Class: Solenogastres
- Order: Neomeniamorpha
- Family: Hemimeniidae
- Genus: Hemimenia

Genus of molluscs

Hemimenia is a genus of solenogasters, shell-less, worm-like mollusks.
