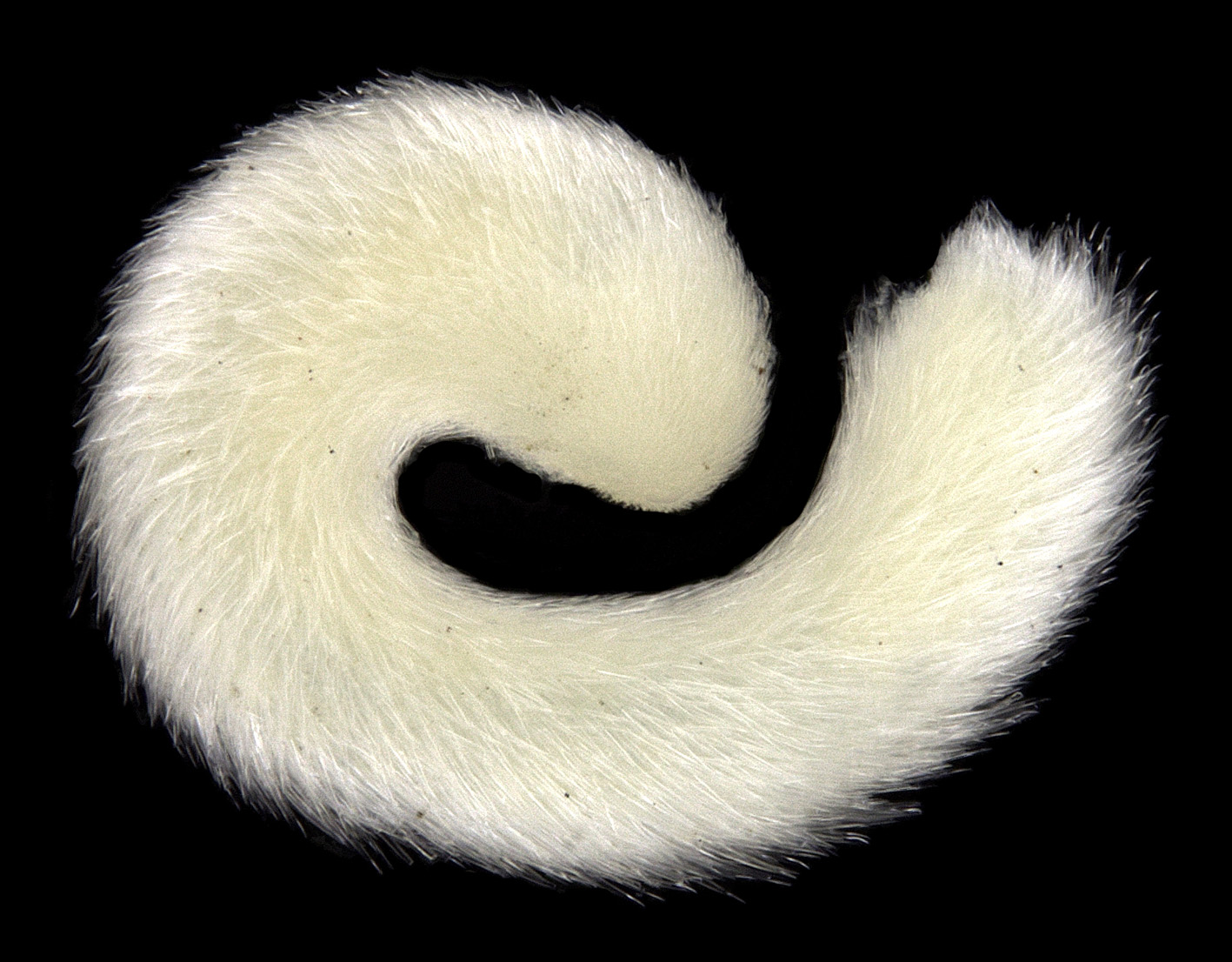
- Amboherpia heterotecta

Scientific classification
- Kingdom: Animalia
- Phylum: Mollusca
- Class: Solenogastres
- Family: Acanthomeniidae
- Genus: Amboherpia; Handl & Salvini-Plawen, 2002

Type species
- Amboherpia heterotecta Handl & Salvini-Plawen, 2002

= Amboherpia =

Genus of molluscs

Amboherpia is a genus of solenogaster, a kind of shell-less, worm-like mollusk.

== Species ==
- Amboherpia abyssokurilensis Bergmeier, Brandt, Schwabe & Jörger, 2017
- Amboherpia dolicopharyngeata Gil-Mansilla, García-Álvarez & Urgorri, 2008
- Amboherpia heterotecta Handl & Salvini-Plawen, 2002
