= Harpagoherpia =

Scientific classification
- Domain: Eukaryota
- Kingdom: Animalia
- Phylum: Mollusca
- Class: Solenogastres
- Order: Sterrofustia
- Family: Phyllomeniidae
- Genus: Harpagoherpia

Genus of molluscs

Harpagoherpia is a genus of sterrofustian solenogasters, marine shell-less, worm-like mollusks.
