= Archaeomenia =

Scientific classification
- Domain: Eukaryota
- Kingdom: Animalia
- Phylum: Mollusca
- Class: Solenogastres
- Order: Neomeniamorpha
- Family: Hemimeniidae
- Genus: Archaeomenia

Genus of molluscs

Archaeomenia is a genus of neomeniamorph solenogaster, a kind of shell-less, worm-like mollusk.
