= Notomenia =

Scientific classification
- Domain: Eukaryota
- Kingdom: Animalia
- Phylum: Mollusca
- Class: Solenogastres
- Family: Notomeniidae; Salvini-Plawen 2004
- Genus: Notomenia; Thiele, 1897
- Species: N. clavigera

Binomial name
- Notomenia clavigera Thiele, 1897

Genus of molluscs

Notomenia is a genus of solenogasters, shell-less, worm-like, marinemollusks. In this genus the animal bears non-mineralized sclerites. This genus is the sole representative of the family Notomeniidae, and has secondarily reduced its radula, which is vestigial.
