= Acanthomenia =

Scientific classification
- Domain: Eukaryota
- Kingdom: Animalia
- Phylum: Mollusca
- Class: Solenogastres
- Family: Acanthomeniidae
- Genus: Acanthomenia; Thiele, 1913

Type species
- Acanthomenia gaussiana Thiele, 1913

Genus of molluscs

Acanthomenia is a genus of solenogasters, shell-less, worm-like, marine mollusks.

== Species ==
- Acanthomenia arcuata Scheltema, 1999
- Acanthomenia gaussiana Thiele, 1913
