= Dinomenia =

Scientific classification
- Kingdom: Animalia
- Phylum: Mollusca
- Class: Solenogastres
- Family: Rhopalomeniidae
- Genus: Dinomenia; Nierstrasz, 1902

Type species
- Dinomenia hubrechti Nierstrasz, 1902

Genus of molluscs

Dinomenia is a genus of solenogaster, one kind of small, shell-less mollusk.

== Species ==
- Dinomenia hubrechti Nierstrasz, 1902
