= Meromenia =

Scientific classification
- Kingdom: Animalia
- Phylum: Mollusca
- Class: Solenogastres
- Family: Amphimeniidae
- Genus: Meromenia; Leloup, 1949

Type species
- Meromenia hirondellei Leloup, 1949

Genus of molluscs

Meromenia is a genus of solenogasters, shell-less, worm-like, marinemollusks.

== Species ==
- Meromenia hirondellei Leloup, 1949
