= Pruvotia =

Scientific classification
- Kingdom: Animalia
- Phylum: Mollusca
- Class: Solenogastres
- Family: Rhopalomeniidae
- Genus: Pruvotia; Thiele, 1894

Type species
- Proneomenia sopita Pruvot, 1891

Genus of molluscs

Pruvotia is a genus of cavibelonian solenogaster.

The position of this genus in the taxonomy is uncertain.

== Species ==
- Pruvotia sopita (Pruvot, 1891)
