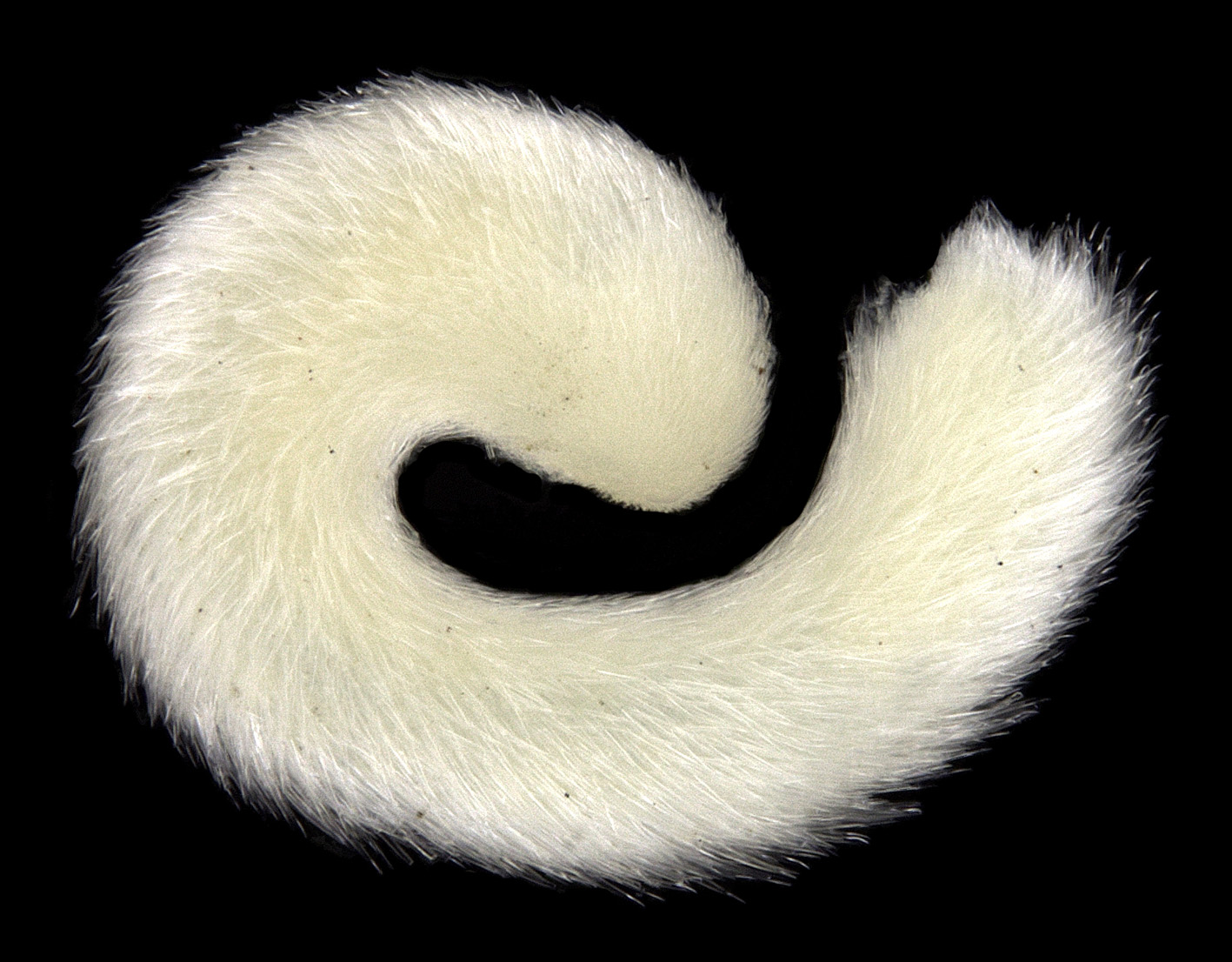

Scientific classification
- Domain: Eukaryota
- Kingdom: Animalia
- Phylum: Mollusca
- Class: Solenogastres
- Family: Acanthomeniidae
- Genus: Amboherpia
- Species: A. heterotecta

Binomial name
- Amboherpia heterotecta Handl & Salvini-Plawen, 2002

= Amboherpia heterotecta =

Species of mollusc

Amboherpia heterotecta is a species of solenogaster within the family Acanthomeniidae. The species is found in benthic marine environments off the coasts of Norway, with the type locality being located in the Korsfjorden fjord near Bakkasund, at a depth of 610 meters.
