= Epiherpia =

Scientific classification
- Kingdom: Animalia
- Phylum: Mollusca
- Class: Solenogastres
- Family: Epimeniidae
- Genus: Epiherpia; Salvini-Plawen, 1997
- Species: E. vixinsignis

Binomial name
- Epiherpia vixinsignis (Salvini-Plawen, 1978)

Synonyms
- Epimenia vixinsignis Salvini-Plawen, 1978 (type species)

Genus of molluscs

Epiherpia is a genus of solenogasters, shell-less, worm-like molluscs.

It contains only one known species, Epiherpia vixinsignis, which was originally classified as a species of Epimenia, with doubt, based on a single immature specimen.
