= Tegulaherpia =

Scientific classification
- Domain: Eukaryota
- Kingdom: Animalia
- Phylum: Mollusca
- Class: Solenogastres
- Order: Pholidoskepia
- Family: Lepidomeniidae
- Genus: Tegulaherpia

Species
- T. tasmanica Salvini-Plawen

Genus of molluscs

Tegulaherpia is a genus of pholidoskepian solenogasters, shell-less, worm-like, marine mollusks. Its sclerites are flattened and resemble the sclerites of Halkieria.
