= Alexandromenia =

Scientific classification
- Domain: Eukaryota
- Kingdom: Animalia
- Phylum: Mollusca
- Class: Solenogastres
- Family: Amphimeniidae
- Genus: Alexandromenia; Heath, 1911

Type species
- Alexandromenia agassizi Heath, 1911

Genus of molluscs

Alexandromenia is a genus of solenogaster, a kind of shell-less, worm-like mollusk.

It lives in Benthic zone regions in tropical climates. It can be found in the Western Atlantic.

== Species ==
- Alexandromenia acuminata Salvini-Plawen, 1978
- Alexandromenia agassizi Heath, 1911
- Alexandromenia antartica Salvini-Plawen, 1978
- Alexandromenia avempacensis Pedrouzo & Cobo, 2014
- Alexandromenia crassa Odhner, 1920
- Alexandromenia grimaldii Leloup, 1946
- Alexandromenia gulaglandulata Salvini-Plawen, 2008
- Alexandromenia heteroglandulata Salvini-Plawen & Schwabe, 2012
- Alexandromenia latosoleata Salvini-Plawen, 1978
- Alexandromenia marisjaponica Saito & Salvini-Plawen, 2014
- Alexandromenia pilosa Handl & Salvini-Plawen, 2002
- Alexandromenia valida Heath, 1911
