= Utralvoherpia =

Scientific classification
- Domain: Eukaryota
- Kingdom: Animalia
- Phylum: Mollusca
- Class: Solenogastres
- Family: Amphimeniidae
- Genus: Utralvoherpia; Salvini-Plawen, 1978

Type species
- Utralvoherpia abyssalis Salvini-Plawen, 1978

Genus of molluscs

Utralvoherpia is a genus of solenogasters, shell-less, worm-like, marine mollusks.

== Species ==
- Utralvoherpia abyssalis Salvini-Plawen, 1978
