= Luitfriedia =

Scientific classification
- Domain: Eukaryota
- Kingdom: Animalia
- Phylum: Mollusca
- Class: Solenogastres
- Family: Pruvotinidae
- Genus: Luitfriedia; García-Alvarez & Urgorri, 2001
- Species: L. minuta

Binomial name
- Luitfriedia minuta García-Alvarez & Urgorri, 2001

Genus of molluscs

Luitfriedia is a monospecific genus of solenogasters, shell-less, worm-like, marinemollusks. This genus, and the sole species, Luitfriedia minuta, occurs in Galicia, Spain.

The genus was named in honor of the malacologist Luitfried von Salvini-Plawen.

== Description ==
This solenogaster bears a range of differently-shaped spicules. It lacks a radula, and bears ten to twelve "respiratory folds".
