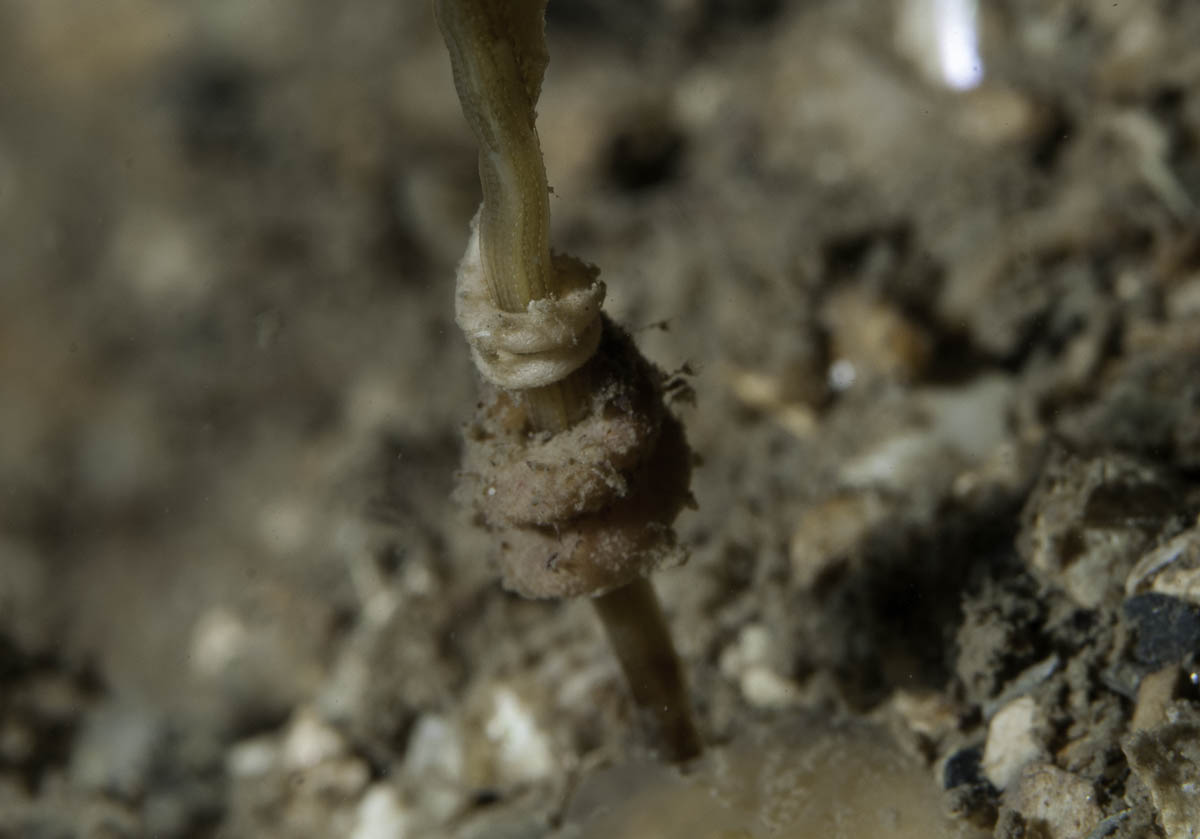
- Rhopalomenia aglaopheniae found at Firth of Lorn, Scotland

Scientific classification
- Kingdom: Animalia
- Phylum: Mollusca
- Class: Solenogastres
- Family: Rhopalomeniidae
- Genus: Rhopalomenia; Simroth, 1893

Type species
- Proneomenia aglaopheniae Kowalevsky & Marion, 1887

= Rhopalomenia =

Genus of molluscs

Rhopalomenia is a genus of solenogasters, shell-less, worm-like, marine mollusks.

== Species ==
Species within the genus Rhopalomenia include:

- Rhopalomenia aglaopheniae (Kowalevsky & Marion, 1887)
- Rhopalomenia glandulosa Eisenhut & Salvini-Plawen, 2006

Species brought into synonymy

- Rhopalomenia atlantica (Leloup, 1948): synonym of Entonomenia atlantica Leloup, 1948
- Rhopalomenia carinata Salvini-Plawen, 1978: synonym of Entonomenia carinata (Salvini-Plawen, 1978)
- Rhopalomenia cristata Salvini-Plawen, 1978: synonym of Entonomenia cristata (Salvini-Plawen, 1978)
- Rhopalomenia debilis Nierstrasz, 1902: synonym of Strophomenia debilis (Nierstrasz, 1902)
- Rhopalomenia eisigi Thiele, 1894: synonym of Rhopalomenia aglaopheniae (Kowalevsky & Marion, 1887)
- Rhopalomenia indica Nierstrasz, 1902: synonym of Strophomenia indica (Nierstrasz, 1902)
- Rhopalomenia microporata Handl & Salvini-Plawen, 2002: synonym of Entonomenia microporata (Handl & Salvini-Plawen, 2002)
- Rhopalomenia rhynchopharyngeata Salvini-Plawen, 1978: synonym of Entonomenia rhynchopharyngeata (Salvini-Plawen, 1978)
- Rhopalomenia scandens Heath, 1905: synonym of Strophomenia scandens (Heath, 1905)
- Rhopalomenia sertulariicola Salvini-Plawen, 1978: synonym of Entonomenia sertulariicola (Salvini-Plawen, 1978)
- Rhopalomenia tricarinata Salvini-Plawen, 1978: synonym of Entonomenia tricarinata (Salvini-Plawen, 1978)
