= Pruvot =

Pruvot may refer to:

- Fabien Pruvot, director of Japan (film), 2008
- Georges Pruvot (1852–1924), French zoologist
- Marie-Jane Pruvot, member of the European Parliament for France, 1979–84
- Marie-Pierre Pruvot (born 1935), Algerian–French transgender showgirl

== See also ==
- Pruvotinidae, a family of molluscs
- Alice Pruvot-Fol (1873–1972), French malacologist
