= Thieleherpia =

Scientific classification
- Kingdom: Animalia
- Phylum: Mollusca
- Class: Solenogastres
- Family: Rhipidoherpiidae
- Genus: Thieleherpia; Salvini-Plawen, 2004

Genus of molluscs

Thieleherpia is a genus of solenogasters, shell-less, worm-like, marine mollusks.

== Species ==
- Thieleherpia thulensis (Thiele, 1900)
