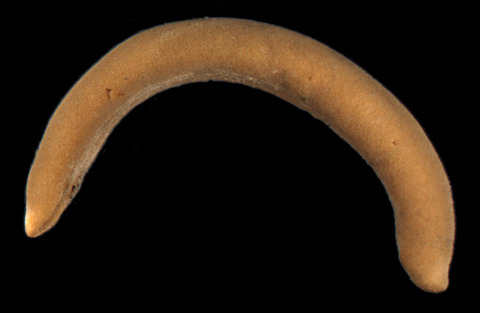
- A typical Proneomenia species

Scientific classification
- Kingdom: Animalia
- Phylum: Mollusca
- Class: Solenogastres
- Family: Proneomeniidae
- Genus: Proneomenia; Hubrecht, 1880

Type species
- Proneomenia sluiteri Hubrecht, 1880

= Proneomenia =

Genus of molluscs

Proneomenia is a genus of Proneomeniid solenogaster.

== Species ==
- Proneomenia acuminata Heath, 1918 - elongate solenogaster
- Proneomenia bulbosa García-Alvarez, Zamarro & Urgorri, 2009
- Proneomenia custodiens Todt & Kocot, 2014
- Proneomenia desiderata Kowalevsky & Marion, 1887
- Proneomenia epibionta Salvini-Plawen, 1978
- Proneomenia gerlachei Pelseneer, 1901
- Proneomenia hawaiiensis Heath, 1905
- Proneomenia insularis Heath, 1911
- Proneomenia praedatoria Salvini-Plawen, 1978
- Proneomenia sluiteri Hubrecht, 1880
- Proneomenia stillerythrocytica Salvini-Plawen, 1978
- Proneomenia valdiviae Thiele, 1902

Species brought into synonymy

- Proneomenia quincarinata Ponder, 1970 : synonym of Dorymenia quincarinata (Ponder, 1970) (original combination)
