= Simrothiella =

Scientific classification
- Kingdom: Animalia
- Phylum: Mollusca
- Class: Solenogastres
- Family: Simrothiellidae
- Genus: Simrothiella; Pilsbry, 1898

Type species
- Solenopus margaritaceus Koren & Danielssen, 1877

Genus of molluscs

Simrothiella is a genus of solenogasters, shell-less, worm-like, marine mollusks.

== Species ==
- Simrothiella abysseuropaea Salvini-Plawen, 2004
- Simrothiella comorensis Todt & Salvini-Plawen, 2003
- Simrothiella digitoradulata Salvini-Plawen, 2004
- Simrothiella margaritacea (Koren & Danielssen, 1877)
- Simrothiella vasconiensis Salvini-Plawen, 2008

Species brought into synonymy

- Simrothiella borealis (Odhner, 1920): synonym of Kruppomenia borealis Odhner, 1920
- Simrothiella minima (Nierstrasz, 1903): synonym of Kruppomenia minima Nierstrasz, 1903 (currently placed in genus Kruppomenia)
- Simrothiella rhynchota Salvini-Plawen, 1978: synonym of Kruppomenia rhynchota (Salvini-Plawen, 1978)
- Simrothiella sarsi (Koren & Danielssen, 1877): synonym of Dorymenia sarsii (Koren & Danielssen, 1877)
- Simrothiella schizoradulata Salvini-Plawen, 1978: synonym of Plawenia schizoradulata (Salvini-Plawen, 1978)
