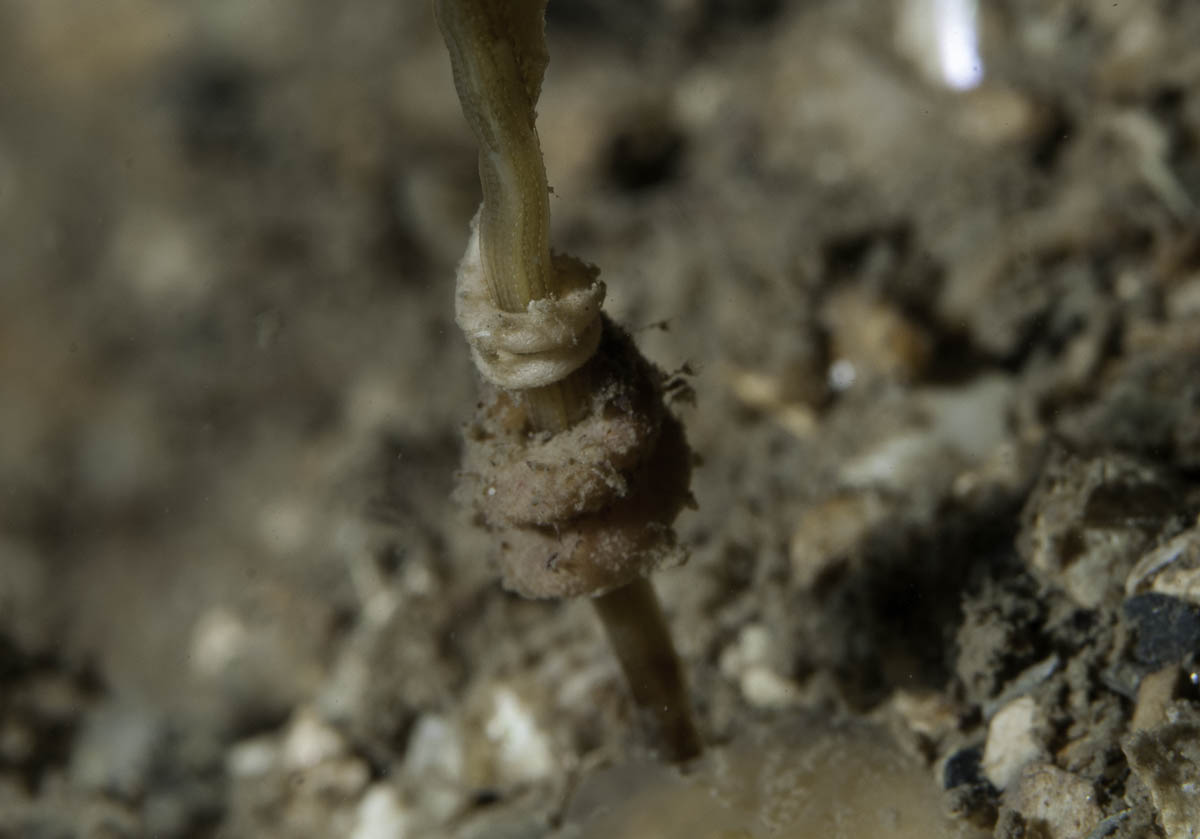
- The solenogaster Rhopalomenia aglaopheniae, Firth of Lorne, Scotland.

Scientific classification
- Domain: Eukaryota
- Kingdom: Animalia
- Phylum: Mollusca
- Class: Solenogastres
- Family: Rhopalomeniidae
- Genus: Rhopalomenia
- Species: R. aglaopheniae

Binomial name
- Rhopalomenia aglaopheniae (Kowalevsky & Marion, 1887)

= Rhopalomenia aglaopheniae =

Species of mollusc

Rhopalomenia aglaopheniae is a species of solenogasters, shell-less, worm-like, marine molluscs.

== Distribution ==
This species is found in the North Atlantic Ocean.
