= Biserramenia =

Scientific classification
- Kingdom: Animalia
- Phylum: Mollusca
- Class: Solenogastres
- Family: Simrothiellidae
- Genus: Biserramenia; Salvini-Plawen, 1967

Type species
- Biserramenia psammobionta Salvini-Plawen, 1967

Genus of molluscs

Biserramenia is a genus of solenogaster, a kind of shell-less, worm-like mollusk.

== Species ==
- Biserramenia psammobionta Salvini-Plawen, 1967
