= Driomenia =

Scientific classification
- Domain: Eukaryota
- Kingdom: Animalia
- Phylum: Mollusca
- Class: Solenogastres
- Family: Rhopalomeniidae
- Genus: Driomenia; Heath, 1911

Type species
- Driomenia pacifica Heath, 1911

Genus of molluscs

Driomenia is a genus of solenogasters, a kind of shell-less, worm-like mollusk.

== Species ==
- Driomenia pacifica Heath, 1911
