= Kruppomenia =

Scientific classification
- Domain: Eukaryota
- Kingdom: Animalia
- Phylum: Mollusca
- Class: Solenogastres
- Family: Simrothiellidae
- Genus: Kruppomenia; Nierstrasz, 1903

Type species
- Kruppomenia minima Nierstrasz, 1903

Genus of molluscs

Kruppomenia is a genus of solenogaster, a kind of shell-less, worm-like, marine mollusk.

One species is 2.5 mm long.

== Species ==
- Kruppomenia angolensis Gil-Mansilla, García-Álvarez & Urgorri, 2012
- Kruppomenia borealis Odhner, 1920
- Kruppomenia bulla Zamarro, García-Álvarez & Urgorri, 2015
- Kruppomenia delta Scheltema & Schander, 2000
- Kruppomenia genslerae Ostermair, Brandt, Haszprunar, Jörger & Bergmeier, 2018
- Kruppomenia glandulata Gil-Mansilla, García-Álvarez & Urgorri, 2012
- Kruppomenia levis Scheltema & Schander, 2000
- Kruppomenia macrodenticulata Gil-Mansilla, García-Álvarez & Urgorri, 2012
- Kruppomenia macrodoryata Todt & Salvini-Plawen, 2003
- Kruppomenia minima Nierstrasz, 1903
- Kruppomenia nanodentata Todt & Salvini-Plawen, 2003
- Kruppomenia rhynchota (Salvini-Plawen, 1978)
- Kruppomenia vitucoi Zamarro & García-Álvarez, 2015
