= Meioherpia =

Scientific classification
- Domain: Eukaryota
- Kingdom: Animalia
- Phylum: Mollusca
- Class: Solenogastres
- Order: Pholidoskepia
- Family: Meiomeniidae
- Genus: Meioherpia

Genus of molluscs

Meioherpia is a genus of pholidoskepian solenogasters, shell-less, worm-like, marinemollusks.
