= Plawenia =

Scientific classification
- Kingdom: Animalia
- Phylum: Mollusca
- Class: Solenogastres
- Family: Simrothiellidae
- Genus: Plawenia; Scheltema & Schander, 2000

Type species
- Simrothiella schizoradulata Salvini-Plawen, 1978

Genus of molluscs

Plawenia a genus of solenogasters, shell-less, worm-like, marine mollusks.

== Species ==
- Plawenia argentinensis Scheltema & Schander, 2000
- Plawenia schizoradulata (Salvini-Plawen, 1978)
- Plawenia sphaera Scheltema & Schander, 2000
