= Rhipidoherpia =

Scientific classification
- Kingdom: Animalia
- Phylum: Mollusca
- Class: Solenogastres
- Family: Rhipidoherpiidae
- Genus: Rhipidoherpia; Salvini-Plawen, 1978

Type species
- Rhipidoherpia copulobursata Salvini-Plawen, 1978

Genus of molluscs

Rhipidoherpia is a genus of solenogasters, shell-less, worm-like, marine mollusks.

== Species ==
- Rhipidoherpia copulobursata Salvini-Plawen, 1978
