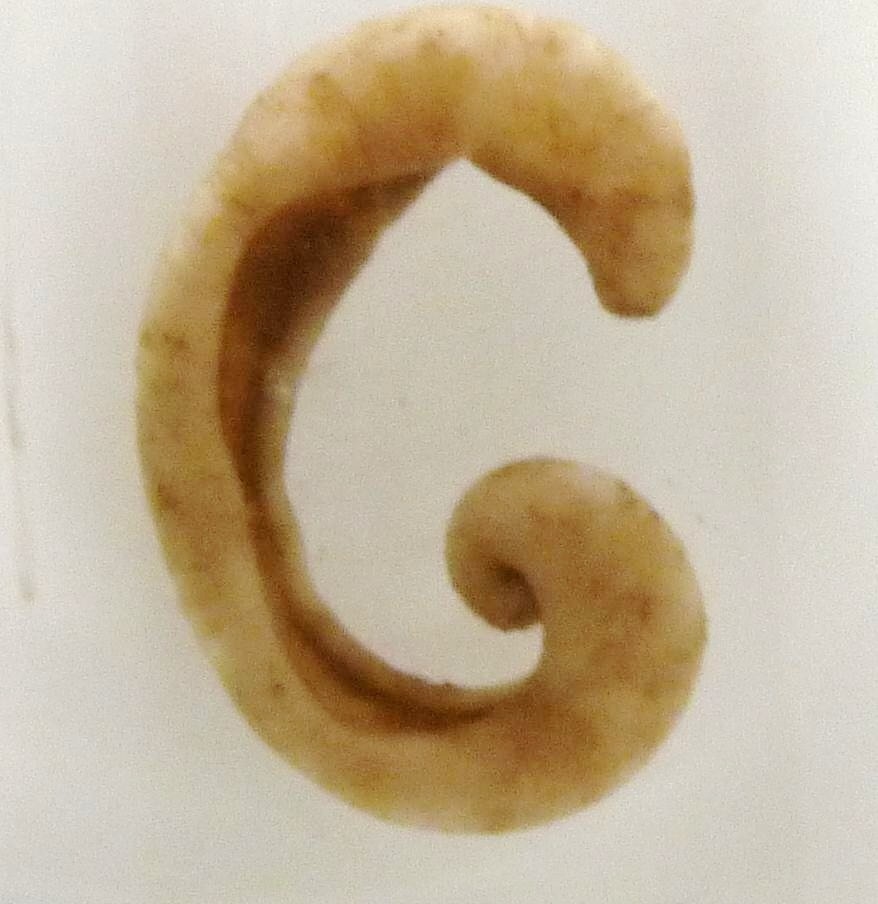
- A preserved specimen of Epimenia verrucosa

Scientific classification
- Domain: Eukaryota
- Kingdom: Animalia
- Phylum: Mollusca
- Class: Solenogastres
- Family: Epimeniidae
- Genus: Epimenia; Nierstrasz, 1908

Type species
- Proneomenia australis Thiele, 1897

= Epimenia =

Genus of molluscs

Epimenia is a genus of cavibelonian solenogasters, a kind of shell-less, worm-like mollusks.

During the development of species in this genus, the sclerites start out as solid tips, then a hollow stalk develops that is subsequently infilled.

== Species ==
- Epimenia allohaemata Salvini-Plawen, 1997
- Epimenia arabica Salvini-Plawen & Benayahu, 1991
- Epimenia australis (Thiele, 1897)
- Epimenia babai Salvini-Plawen, 1997
- Epimenia indica Salvini-Plawen, 1978
- Epimenia ohshimai Baba, 1940

Species brought into synonymy

- Epimenia verrucosa (Nierstrasz, 1902): synonym of Epimenia babai Salvini-Plawen, 1997
- Epimenia vixinsignis Salvini-Plawen, 1978: synonym of Epiherpia vixinsignis (Salvini-Plawen, 1978)
