= Cyclomenia =

Scientific classification
- Kingdom: Animalia
- Phylum: Mollusca
- Class: Solenogastres
- Family: Simrothiellidae
- Genus: Cyclomenia; Nierstrasz, 1902

Type species
- Cyclomenia holosericea Nierstrasz, 1902

Genus of molluscs

Cyclomenia is a genus of solenogaster, a kind of shell-less, worm-like mollusk.

== Species ==
- Cyclomenia holosericea Nierstrasz, 1902
