= Proparamenia =

Scientific classification
- Kingdom: Animalia
- Phylum: Mollusca
- Class: Solenogastres
- Family: Amphimeniidae
- Genus: Proparamenia; Nierstrasz, 1902

Type species
- Proparamenia bivalens Nierstrasz, 1902

Genus of molluscs

Proparamenia is a genus of solenogasters, shell-less, worm-like marine mollusks.

== Species ==
- Proparamenia bivalens Nierstrasz, 1902
