= Helicoradomenia =

Scientific classification
- Kingdom: Animalia
- Phylum: Mollusca
- Class: Solenogastres
- Family: Simrothiellidae
- Genus: Helicoradomenia

Type species
- Helicoradomenia juani Scheltema & Kuzirian, 1991

Genus of molluscs

Helicoradomenia is a genus of solenogasters, shell-less, worm-like mollusks.

Some species in this genus inhabit mid-ocean ridges.

== Species ==
- Helicoradomenia acredema Scheltema, 2000
- Helicoradomenia bisquama Scheltema, 2000
- Helicoradomenia juani Scheltema & Kuzirian, 1991
- Helicoradomenia parathermalis Salvini-Plawen, 2008
