= Dondersia =

Scientific classification
- Domain: Eukaryota
- Kingdom: Animalia
- Phylum: Mollusca
- Class: Solenogastres
- Order: Pholidoskepia
- Family: Dondersiidae
- Genus: Dondersia

Genus of molluscs

Dondersia is a genus of pholidoskepian solenogasters, a kind of shell-less, worm-like mollusk.
