= Lepidomenia =

Scientific classification
- Domain: Eukaryota
- Kingdom: Animalia
- Phylum: Mollusca
- Class: Solenogastres
- Order: Pholidoskepia
- Family: Lepidomeniidae
- Genus: Lepidomenia

Genus of molluscs

Lepidomenia is a genus of pholidoskepian solenogasters, shell-less, worm-like, marinemollusks.
