= Strophomenia =

Scientific classification
- Kingdom: Animalia
- Phylum: Mollusca
- Class: Solenogastres
- Family: Strophomeniidae
- Genus: Strophomenia; Pruvot, 1899

Type species
- Strophomenia lacazei Pruvot, 1899

Genus of molluscs

Strophomenia is a genus of solenogasters, shell-less, worm-like, marine mollusks.

== Species ==
- Strophomenia debilis (Nierstrasz, 1902)
- Strophomenia indica (Nierstrasz, 1902)
- Strophomenia lacazei Pruvot, 1899
- Strophomenia ophidiana Heath, 1911
- Strophomenia regularis Heath, 1911
- Strophomenia scandens (Heath, 1905)

Species brought into synonymy

- Strophomenia agassizi Heath, 1918: synonym of Anamenia agassizi (Heath, 1918)
- Strophomenia farcimen Heath, 1911: synonym of Anamenia farcimen (Heath, 1911)
- Strophomenia spinosa Heath, 1911: synonym of Anamenia spinosa (Heath, 1911)
- Strophomenia triangularis Heath, 1911: synonym of Anamenia triangularis (Heath, 1911)
