= Phyllomenia =

Scientific classification
- Domain: Eukaryota
- Kingdom: Animalia
- Phylum: Mollusca
- Class: Solenogastres
- Order: Sterrofustia
- Family: Phyllomeniidae
- Genus: Phyllomenia

Genus of molluscs

Phyllomenia is a genus of sterrofustian solenogasters, shell-less, worm-like, marine mollusks.
