= Helluoherpia =

Scientific classification
- Kingdom: Animalia
- Phylum: Mollusca
- Class: Solenogastres
- Order: Pholidoskepia
- Family: Dondersiidae
- Genus: Helluoherpia

Genus of molluscs

Helluoherpia is a genus of pholidoskepian solenogasters, shell-less, worm-like marine mollusks. It's 3–6 mm long and 200–300 μm wide.
