= Meiomenia =

Scientific classification
- Kingdom: Animalia
- Phylum: Mollusca
- Class: Solenogastres
- Order: Pholidoskepia
- Family: Meiomeniidae
- Genus: Meiomenia

Genus of molluscs

Meiomenia is a genus of pholidoskepian solenogasters, shell-less, worm-like, marine mollusks.
