= Sandalomenia =

Scientific classification
- Domain: Eukaryota
- Kingdom: Animalia
- Phylum: Mollusca
- Class: Solenogastres
- Order: Pholidoskepia
- Family: Sandalomeniidae
- Genus: Sandalomenia

Genus of molluscs

Sandalomenia is a genus of solenogaster, and the only genus in its family.

The type species is Sandalomenia papilligera Thiele, 1913

== Species ==
- Sandalomenia carinata Thiele, 1913
- Sandalomenia papilligera Thiele, 1913
