= Imeroherpiidae =

Scientific classification
- Domain: Eukaryota
- Kingdom: Animalia
- Phylum: Mollusca
- Class: Solenogastres
- Order: Sterrofustia
- Family: Imeroherpiidae
- Genus: Imeroherpia

Family of molluscs

Imeroherpiidae is a family of solenogaster, comprising the sole genus Imeroherpia.
