= Georges Pruvôt =

French zoologist

Georges Florentin Pruvôt
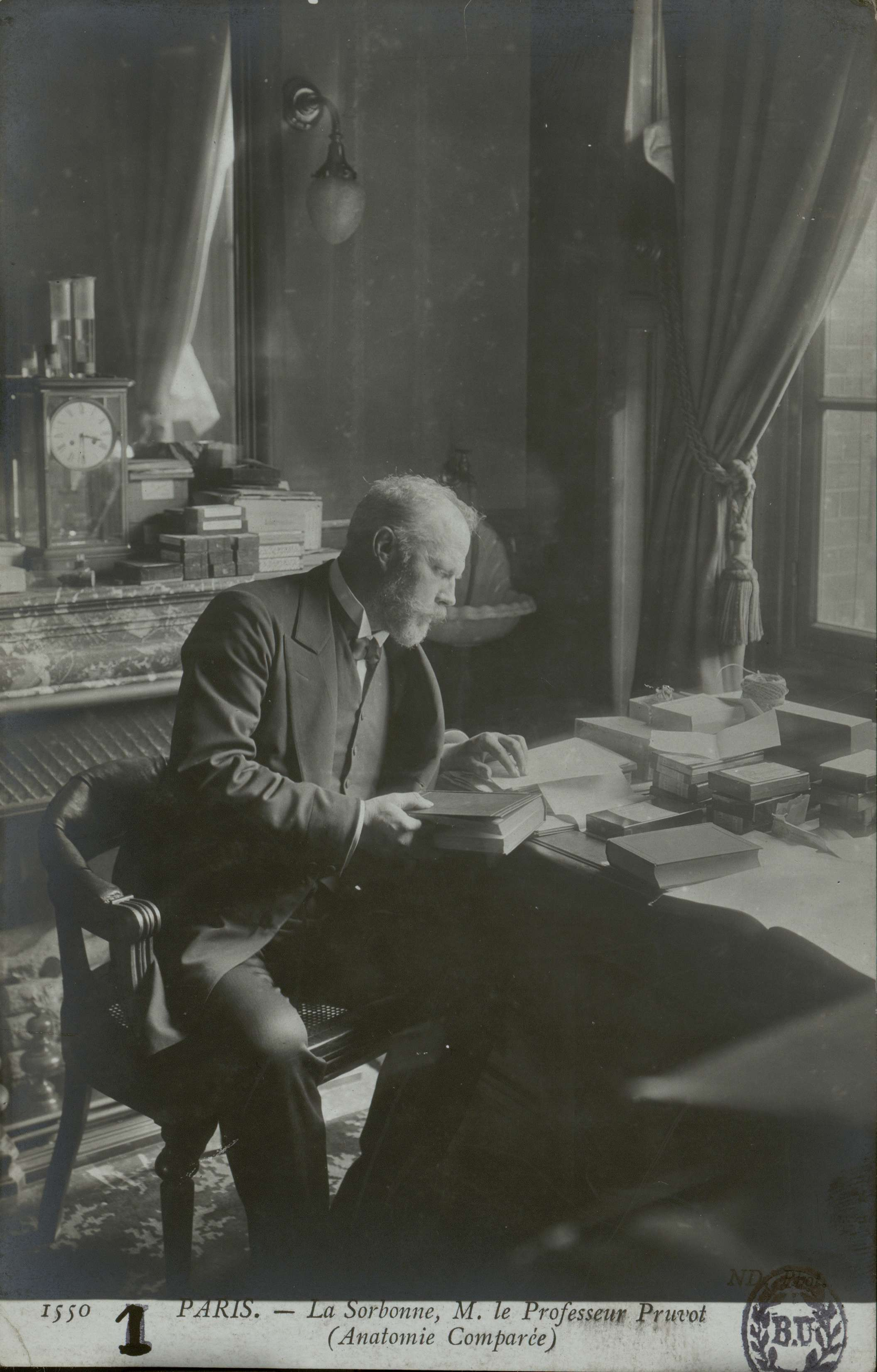
- Born: 11 April 1852; Saint-Amand-Montrond, France
- Died: 15 October 1924 (aged 72); Neuilly-sur-Seine, France
- Citizenship: France
- Scientific career
- Fields: Biology, zoology

Georges Florentin Pruvôt (11 April 1852, Saint-Amand-Montrond – 15 October 1924, Paris) was a French zoologist. He was the husband of malacologist Alice Pruvot-Fol (1873-1972).

He studied in Paris, obtaining his medical doctorate in 1882, followed by his doctorate in natural sciences in 1885. From 1885 he was a lecturer to the faculty of sciences in Paris, later relocating to Grenoble, where in 1893 he became a professor of zoology. In 1898 he returned to Paris as chef des travaux de zoologie (chief of zoological research). In 1900 he was named director of the laboratory at Banyuls-sur-Mer, and two years later, began giving classes in comparative anatomy in Paris.

The solenogaster genus Pruvotia was named after him by Johannes Thiele. Also, organisms with the specific epithet of pruvoti are named in his honor.

== Selected works ==
- Anatomiques et Recherches sur le systems morphologiques nerveux of Annelides polychetes, 1885 - Anatomical and morphological research on the nervous system of Polychaeta.
- Vers et arthropod, 1886 - Worms and arthropods.
- Annelides polychetes de Nouvelle-Calidonie recueillies Francois, 1930 - Polychaete annelids of New Caledonia collected by François (Introduction and notes by Pierre Fauvel).
