= Macellomenia =

Scientific classification
- Domain: Eukaryota
- Kingdom: Animalia
- Phylum: Mollusca
- Class: Solenogastres
- Order: Pholidoskepia
- Family: Macellomeniidae
- Genus: Macellomenia

Genus of molluscs

Macellomenia is a genus of solenogaster, and the only genus in its family.

The type species is Paramenia palifera Pruvot, 1890

== Species ==
- Macellomenia aciculata Scheltema, 1999
- Macellomenia adenota Salvini-Plawen, 2003
- Macellomenia morseae Kocot & Todt, 2014
- Macellomenia palifera (Pruvot, 1890)
- Macellomenia schanderi Kocot & Todt, 2014
