= Dorymenia quincarinata =

Scientific classification
- Domain: Eukaryota
- Kingdom: Animalia
- Phylum: Mollusca
- Class: Solenogastres
- Family: Proneomeniidae
- Genus: Dorymenia
- Species: D. quincarinata

Binomial name
- Dorymenia quincarinata (Ponder, 1970)

Synonyms
- Proneomenia quincarinata Ponder, 1970

Species of mollusc

Dorymenia quincarinata is a species of mollusc of solenogastres in the family Proneomeniidae. It was first described in 1970 by Winston Ponder as Proneomenia quincarinata.

Solenogastres may or may not be the sister group of chitons.

== Distribution ==
New Zealand
