= Heteroherpia =

Scientific classification
- Domain: Eukaryota
- Kingdom: Animalia
- Phylum: Mollusca
- Class: Solenogastres
- Order: Sterrofustia
- Family: Heteroherpiidae; Salvini-Plawen, 1978
- Genus: Heteroherpia; Salvini-Plawen, 1978

Genus of molluscs

Heteroherpia is a genus of solenogaster, and the only genus in the Heteroherpiidae family.
