= Rhabdoherpia =

Scientific classification
- Kingdom: Animalia
- Phylum: Mollusca
- Class: Solenogastres
- Order: Sterrofustia
- Family: incertae sedis
- Genus: Rhabdoherpia

Genus of molluscs

Rhabdoherpia is a genus of solenogaster of uncertain relationship within the order Sterrofustia.
