= Neomeniamorpha =

Scientific classification
- Kingdom: Animalia
- Phylum: Mollusca
- Class: Solenogastres
- Superorder: Aplotegmentaria
- Order: Neomeniamorpha

Families and genera
- See text.

Order of molluscs

The Neomeniamorpha are one of the three taxonomic orders of solenogasters, shell-less, worm-like, marine mollusks.

It is considered an alternate representation for the class Solenogastres.

Families and genera include:

- Hemimeniidae
  - Archaeomenia
  - Hemimenia
- Neomeniidae
  - Neomenia
