= Simrothiellidae =

Scientific classification
- Kingdom: Animalia
- Phylum: Mollusca
- Class: Solenogastres
- Family: Simrothiellidae; Salvini-Plawen, 1978

Type genus
- Simrothiella Pilsbry, 1898

Family of molluscs

Kruppomenia is a family of solenogaster, a kind of shell-less, worm-like, marine mollusk.

== Genera ==
- Adoryherpia Gil-Mansilla, García-Álvarez & Urgorri, 2009
- Aploradoherpia Salvini-Plawen, 2004
- Birasoherpia Salvini-Plawen, 1978
- Biserramenia Salvini-Plawen, 1967
- Cyclomenia Nierstrasz, 1902
- Diptyaloherpia Salvini-Plawen, 2008
- Helicoradomenia Scheltema & Kuzirian, 1991
- Kruppomenia Nierstrasz, 1903
- Plawenia Scheltema & Schander, 2000
- Sensilloherpia Salvini-Plawen, 2008
- Simrothiella Pilsbry, 1898
- Spiomenia Arnofsky, 2000

Synonyms

- Solenopus Sars, 1869 (part): synonym of Simrothiella Pilsbry, 1898
