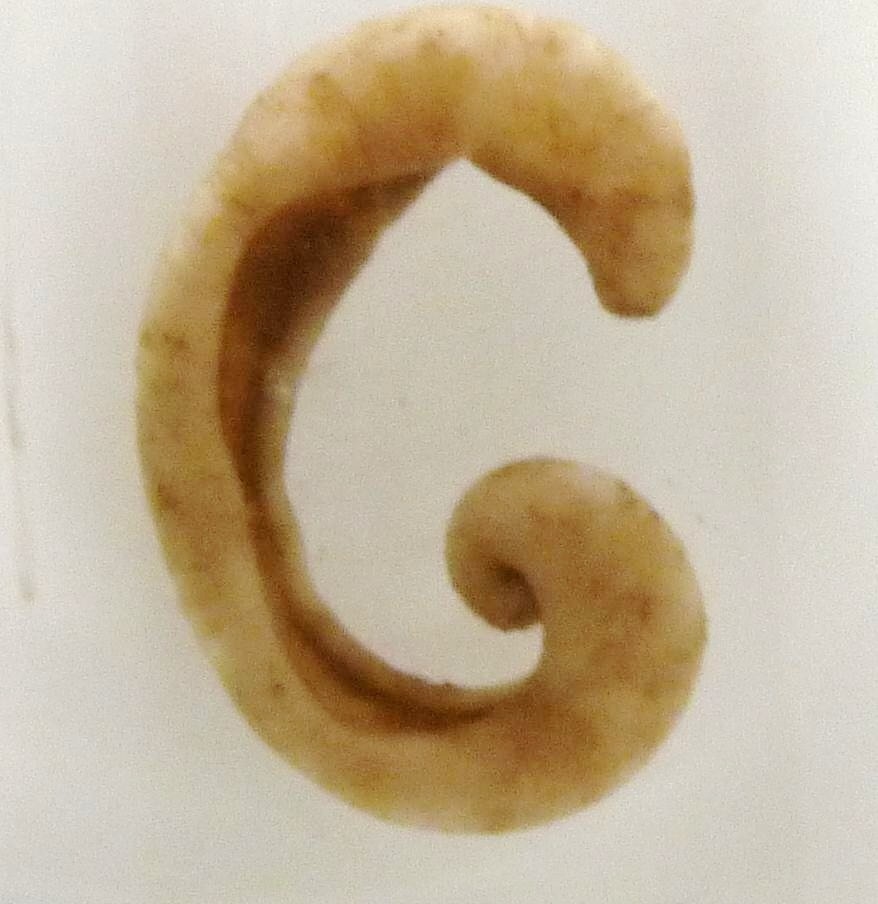
- Epimenia verrucosa

Scientific classification
- Kingdom: Animalia
- Phylum: Mollusca
- Class: Solenogastres
- Family: Epimeniidae; Salvini-Plawen, 1978

= Epimeniidae =

Family of molluscs

Epimeniidae is a family of solenogaster, a shell-less worm-like mollusk.

== Genera ==
- Epiherpia Salvini-Plawen, 1997
- Epimenia Nierstrasz, 1908
