= Meiomeniidae =

Scientific classification
- Domain: Eukaryota
- Kingdom: Animalia
- Phylum: Mollusca
- Class: Solenogastres
- Order: Pholidoskepia
- Family: Meiomeniidae; Salvini-Plawen, 1985

Family of molluscs

Meiomeniidae is a family of molluscs belonging to the order Pholidoskepia.

Genera:

- Meioherpia Salvini-Plawen, 1985
- Meiomenia Morse, 1979
