= Amphimeniidae =

Scientific classification
- Domain: Eukaryota
- Kingdom: Animalia
- Phylum: Mollusca
- Class: Solenogastres
- Family: Amphimeniidae; Salvini-Plawen, 1972

Family of molluscs

Amphimeniidae is a family of solenogaster, a shell-less worm-like mollusk.

== Genera ==
- Alexandromenia Heath, 1911
- Amphimenia Thiele, 1894
- Meromenia Leloup, 1949
- Pachymenia Heath, 1911
- Paragymnomenia Leloup, 1947
- Plathymenia Schwabl, 1961
- Proparamenia Nierstrasz, 1902
- Spengelomenia Heath, 1912
- Sputoherpia Salvini-Plawen, 1978
- Utralvoherpia Salvini-Plawen, 1978
