= Pruvotinidae =

Scientific classification
- Kingdom: Animalia
- Phylum: Mollusca
- Class: Solenogastres
- Family: Pruvotinidae; Heath, 1911

Genera
- See text.

Synonyms
- Parameniidae Simroth, 1893 (invalid: type genus a junior homonym); Pararrhopaliidae Salvini-Plawen, 1972 (synonym); Perimeniidae Nierstrasz, 1908; Pruvotiniidae Heath, 1911 (incorrect original spelling)

Family of molluscs

Pruvotinidae is a diverse taxonomic family of cavibelonian solenogasters, shell-less, worm-like marine mollusks.

== Genera ==
Subfamily Eleutheromeniinae Salvini-Plawen, 1978

- Eleutheromenia Salvini-Plawen, 1967
- Gephyroherpia Salvini-Plawen, 1978
- Luitfriedia Garcia-Álvarez & Urgorri, 2001

Subfamily Halomeniinae Salvini-Plawen, 1978

- Halomenia Heath, 1911

Subfamily Lophomeniinae Salvini-Plawen, 1978

- Forcepimenia Salvini-Plawen, 1969
- Hypomenia van Lummel, 1930
- Lophomenia Heath, 1911
- Metamenia Thiele, 1913

Subfamily Pruvotininae Heath, 1911

- Labidoherpia Salvini-Plawen, 1978
- Pararrhopalia Simroth, 1893
- Pruvotina Cockerell, 1903

Subfamily Scheltemaia incertae sedis

- Scheltemaia Salvini-Plawen, 2003

Subfamily Unciherpiinae Garcia-Álvarez, Salvini-Plawen & Urgorri, 2001

- Sialoherpia Salvini-Plawen, 1978
- Unciherpia Garcia-Álvarez, Salvini-Plawen & Urgorri, 2001
- Uncimenia Nierstrasz, 1903

Synonyms

- Subfamily Pararrhopaliinae Salvini-Plawen, 1978: synonym of Pruvotininae Heath, 1911
- Paramenia Pruvot, 1890: synonym of Pruvotina Cockerell, 1903 (invalid: junior homonym of Paramenia Brauer & Bergenstamm, 1889 [Diptera]; Pruvotina and Perimenia are replacement names )
- Perimenia Nierstrasz, 1908: synonym of Pruvotina Cockerell, 1903
