= Strophomeniidae =

Scientific classification
- Domain: Eukaryota
- Kingdom: Animalia
- Phylum: Mollusca
- Class: Solenogastres
- Family: Strophomeniidae; Salvini-Plawen, 1978

Family of molluscs

Strophomeniidae is a family of solenogaster, a kind of shell-less, worm-like, marine mollusk.

== Genera ==
- Anamenia Nierstrasz, 1908
- Strophomenia Pruvot, 1899
