= Hemimeniidae =

Scientific classification
- Domain: Eukaryota
- Kingdom: Animalia
- Phylum: Mollusca
- Class: Solenogastres
- Order: Neomeniamorpha
- Family: Hemimeniidae; Salvini-Plawen, 1978

Family of molluscs

Hemimeniidae is a family of molluscs belonging to the order Neomeniamorpha.

Genera:

- Archaeomenia Thiele, 1906
- Hemimenia Nierstrasz, 1902
