= Phyllomeniidae =

Scientific classification
- Domain: Eukaryota
- Kingdom: Animalia
- Phylum: Mollusca
- Class: Solenogastres
- Order: Sterrofustia
- Family: Phyllomeniidae

Family of molluscs

Phyllomeniidae is a family of molluscs belonging to the order Sterrofustia.

Genera:

- Harpagoherpia Salvini-Plawen, 1978
- Lituiherpia Salvini-Plawen, 1978
- Ocheyoherpia Salvini-Plawen, 1978
- Phyllomenia Thiele, 1913
- Plicaherpia Garcia-Álvarez, Zamarro & Urgorri, 2010
