= Notomeniidae =

Scientific classification
- Domain: Eukaryota
- Kingdom: Animalia
- Phylum: Mollusca
- Class: Solenogastres
- Family: Notomeniidae; Salvini-Plawen, 2004

Family of molluscs

Notomeniidae is a family of solenogaster, a kind of shell-less, worm-like, marine mollusk.

== Genera ==
- Notomenia Thiele, 1897
