= Drepanomeniidae =

Scientific classification
- Domain: Eukaryota
- Kingdom: Animalia
- Phylum: Mollusca
- Class: Solenogastres
- Family: Drepanomeniidae; Salvini-Plawen, 1978

Family of molluscs

Drepanomeniidae is a family of solenogaster, a kind of shell-less, worm-like, marine mollusk.

== Genera ==
- Abyssoherpia Gil-Mansilla, García-Álvarez & Urgorri, 2011
- Drepanomenia Heath, 1911
