= Pholidoskepia =

Scientific classification
- Kingdom: Animalia
- Phylum: Mollusca
- Class: Solenogastres
- Superorder: Aplotegmentaria
- Order: Pholidoskepia

Families and genera
- See text

Order of molluscs

The Pholidoskepia are one of the three orders of solenogaster.

It is considered an alternate representation for the class Solenogastres.

== Taxonomy ==
- Dondersiidae
  - Dondersia
  - Heathia
  - Helluoherpia
  - Ichthyomenia
  - Lyratoherpia
  - Micromenia
  - Nematomenia
  - Squamatoherpia
  - Stylomenia
- Gymnomeniidae
  - Genitoconi
  - Gymnomenia
  - Wirenia
- Lepidomeniidae
  - Lepidomenia
  - Nierstraszia
  - Tegulaherpia
- Macellomeniidae
  - Macellomenia
- Meiomeniidae
  - Meioherpia
  - Meiomenia
- Sandalomeniidae
  - Sandalomenia
