= Sterrofustia =

Scientific classification
- Kingdom: Animalia
- Phylum: Mollusca
- Class: Solenogastres
- Superorder: Pachytegmentaria
- Order: Sterrofustia

Families and genera
- See text

Order of molluscs

The Sterrofustia are one of the three orders of solenogaster.

The status of this order is uncertain, as it is deemed not monophyletic.

== Taxonomy ==
Families and genera include:

- Heteroherpiidae
  - Heteroherpia
- Imeroherpiidae
  - Imeroherpia
- Phyllomeniidae
  - Harpagoherpia
  - Lituiherpia
  - Ocheyoherpia
  - Phyllomenia
