= Syngenoherpiidae =

Scientific classification
- Kingdom: Animalia
- Phylum: Mollusca
- Class: Solenogastres
- Family: Syngenoherpiidae; Salvini-Plawen, 1978

Family of molluscs

Syngenoherpiidae is a family of solenogaster, a shell-less worm-like mollusk.

This family comprises the sole genus Syngenoherpia.
