= Rhipidoherpiidae =

Scientific classification
- Domain: Eukaryota
- Kingdom: Animalia
- Phylum: Mollusca
- Class: Solenogastres
- Family: Rhipidoherpiidae; Salvini-Plawen, 1978

Family of molluscs

Rhipidoherpiidae is a family of solenogaster, a kind of shell-less, worm-like, marine mollusk.

== Genera ==
- Rhipidoherpia Salvini-Plawen, 1978
- Thieleherpia Salvini-Plawen, 2004
