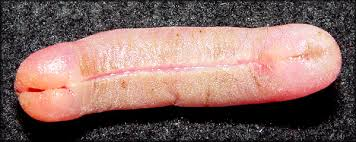

Scientific classification
- Kingdom: Animalia
- Phylum: Mollusca
- Class: Solenogastres
- Order: Neomeniamorpha
- Family: Neomeniidae
- Genus: Neomenia

= Neomeniidae =

Genus of molluscs

Neomenia is a genus of solenogaster, and the only genus in its family.
