= Gymnomeniidae =

Scientific classification
- Domain: Eukaryota
- Kingdom: Animalia
- Phylum: Mollusca
- Class: Solenogastres
- Order: Pholidoskepia
- Family: Gymnomeniidae; Odhner, 1920

Family of molluscs

Gymnomeniidae is a family of molluscs belonging to the order Pholidoskepia.

Genera:

- Genitoconi Salvini-Plawen, 1967
- Gymnomenia Odhner, 1920
- Wirenia Odhner, 1920
