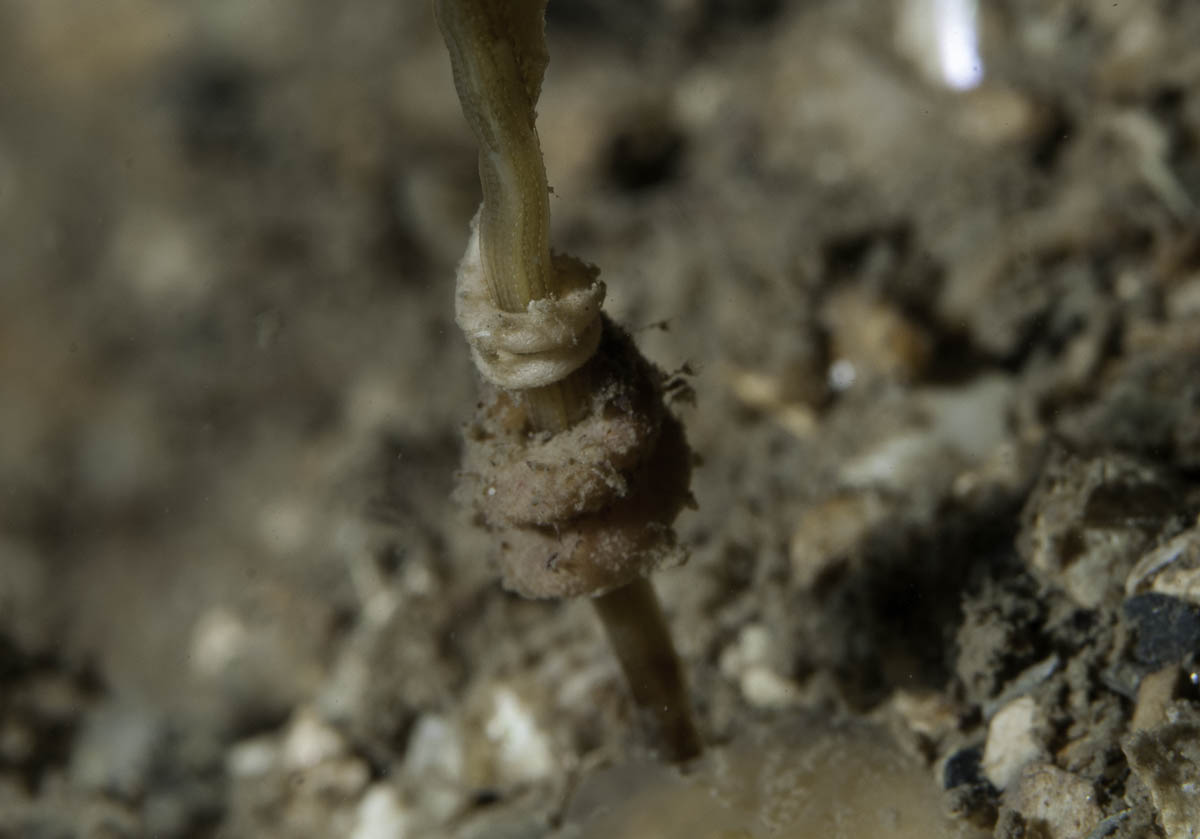
- Rhopalomenia aglaopheniae

Scientific classification
- Domain: Eukaryota
- Kingdom: Animalia
- Phylum: Mollusca
- Class: Solenogastres
- Family: Rhopalomeniidae; Salvini-Plawen, 1978

= Rhopalomeniidae =

Family of molluscs

Rhopalomeniidae is a family of solenogaster, a kind of shell-less, worm-like, marine mollusk.

== Genera ==
- Dinomenia Nierstrasz, 1902
- Driomenia Heath, 1911
- Entonomenia Leloup, 1948
- Pruvotia Thiele, 1894
- Rhopalomenia Simroth, 1893
- Urgorria Garcia-Álvarez & Salvini-Plawen, 2001

Synonyms

- Rhopalomenia Simroth, 1893 (part) synonym of Entonomenia Leloup, 1948
