= Acanthomeniidae =

Scientific classification
- Domain: Eukaryota
- Kingdom: Animalia
- Phylum: Mollusca
- Class: Solenogastres
- Family: Acanthomeniidae; Salvini-Plawen, 1978

Family of molluscs

Acanthomeniidae is a family of solenogaster, a shell-less worm-like mollusk.

== Genera ==
- Acanthomenia Thiele, 1913
- Amboherpia Handl & Salvini-Plawen, 2002
- Veromenia Gil Mansilla, Garcia Alvarez & Urgorri, 2008
