= Lepidomeniidae =

Scientific classification
- Domain: Eukaryota
- Kingdom: Animalia
- Phylum: Mollusca
- Class: Solenogastres
- Order: Pholidoskepia
- Family: Lepidomeniidae

Family of molluscs

Lepidomeniidae is a family of molluscs belonging to the order Pholidoskepia.

Genera:

- Lepidomenia Kowalevsky, 1883
- Nierstrassia Heath, 1918
- Tegulaherpia Salvini-Plawen, 1983
