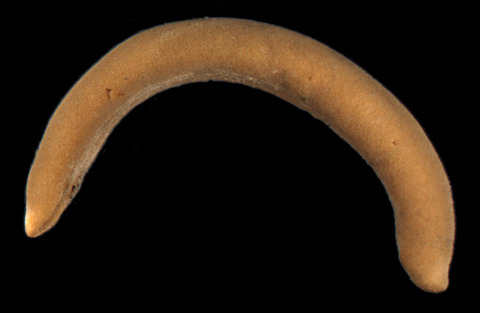
- Proneomenia species

Scientific classification
- Kingdom: Animalia
- Phylum: Mollusca
- Class: Solenogastres
- Family: Proneomeniidae; Mitchell, 1892

Genera
- See text

Synonyms
- Proneomenidae Mitchell, 1892

= Proneomeniidae =

Family of molluscs

Proneomeniidae is a family of uncommon molluscs in the class Solenogastres.

== Genera ==
- Dorymenia Heath, 1911
- Proneomenia Hubrecht, 1880
