= Dondersiidae =

Scientific classification
- Kingdom: Animalia
- Phylum: Mollusca
- Class: Solenogastres
- Order: Pholidoskepia
- Family: Dondersiidae; Simroth, 1893

Family of molluscs

Dondersiidae is a family of molluscs belonging to the order Pholidoskepia.

== Genera ==
Genera:

- Dondersia Hubrecht, 1888
- Heathia Thiele, 1913
- Helluoherpia Handl & Buchinger, 1996
