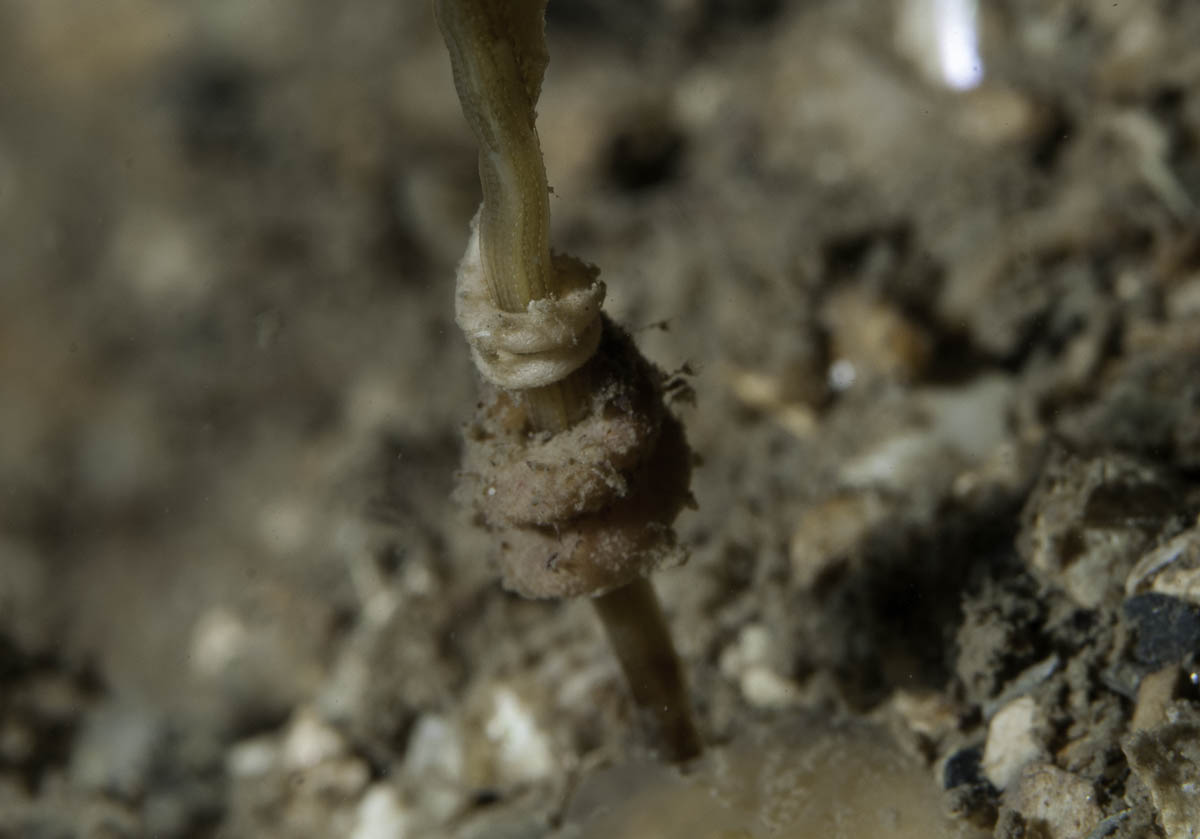
- Rhopalomenia aglaopheniae found at Firth of Lorn, Scotland

Scientific classification
- Domain: Eukaryota
- Kingdom: Animalia
- Phylum: Mollusca
- Class: Solenogastres
- Superorder: Pachytegmentaria
- Order: Cavibelonia

Families
- See text

= Cavibelonia =

Order of molluscs

The Cavibelonia are one of the four orders of solenogaster, a kind of shell-less, worm-like mollusk.

This order is not monophyletic and is no longer accepted.

== Previous families ==
- Acanthomeniidae
- Amphimeniidae
- Drepanomeniidae
- Epimeniidae
- Notomeniidae
- Proneomeniidae
- Pruvotinidae
- Rhipidoherpiidae
- Rhopalomeniidae
- Simrothiellidae
- Strophomeniidae
- Syngenoherpiidae
