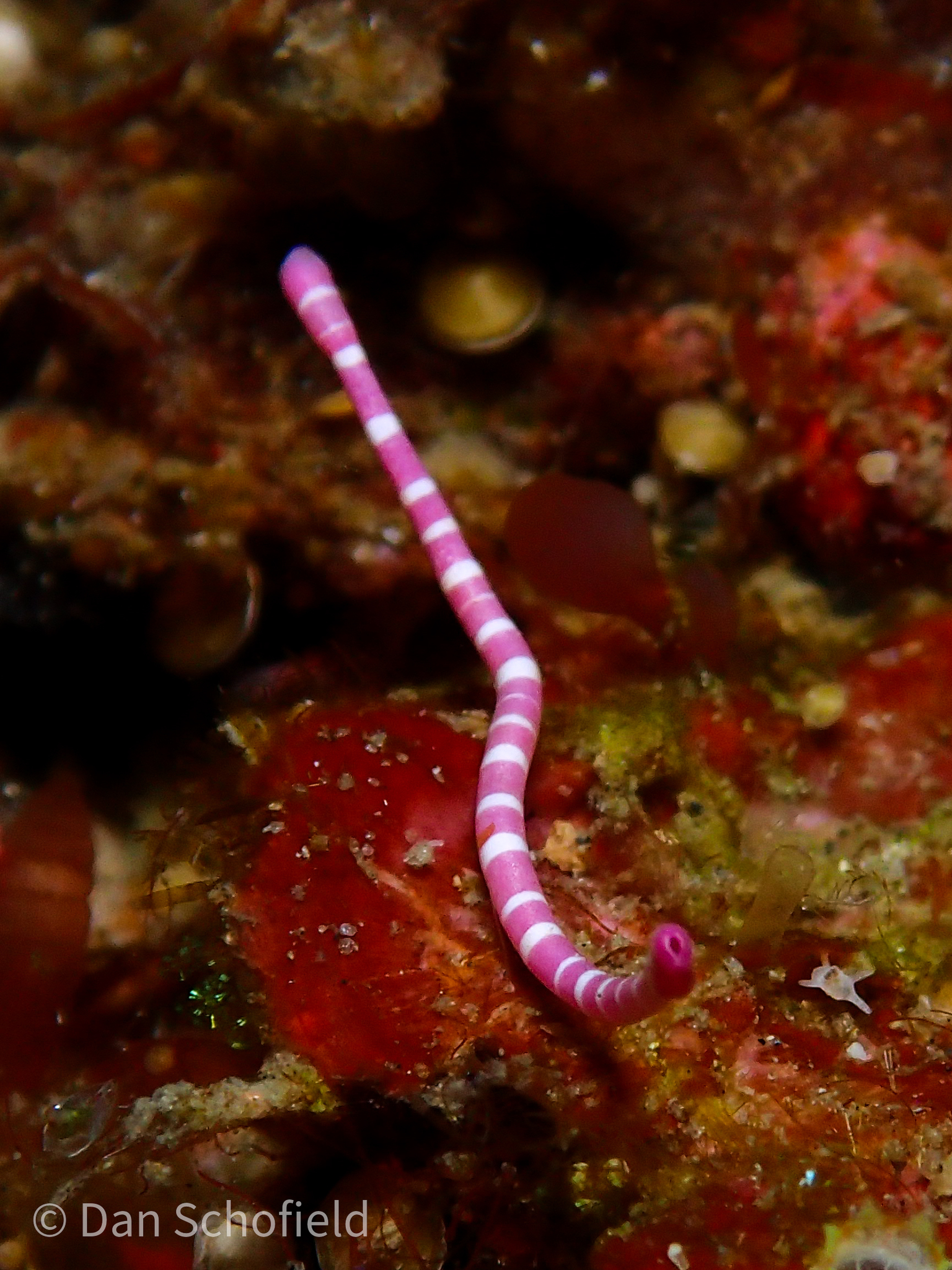
- An individual of the species Dondersia annulata observed in Suli Falls, Indonesia

Scientific classification
- Kingdom: Animalia
- Phylum: Mollusca
- Class: Solenogastres

Orders
- Neomeniamorpha; Pholidoskepia; Sterrofustia

= Solenogastres =

Class of molluscs

The Solenogastres (less often referred to as Neomeniomorpha), commonly known as solenogasters, are a class of small, worm-like, shell-less molluscs (Aplacophora), the other class being the Caudofoveata (Chaetodermomorpha).

Some recent literature and recent molecular evidence, indicates that the Aplacophora may be polyphyletic, and therefore some taxonomists may divide Solenogastres and Caudofoveata into separate classes.

== Morphology ==
In contrast to many other mollusc classes, aplacophorans have no shell, and are instead covered by aragonitic sclerites (calcareous spicules), which can be solid or hollow. These spicules can be arranged perpendicular to one another within the cuticle to form a skeleton, stick up to form a palisade, or can lie flat against the cuticle.

80% of solenogaster species have a radula, while in others it is secondarily lost. The radula may bear one or more teeth per row; where there is more than one tooth, there is no central radular tooth. The radula grows by dividing existing teeth in two, or by adding a new tooth at the center of the radular row. The salivary glands are very elaborate, and are an important characteristic for taxonomy. Next to the mouth they have a unique sense organ, the vestibulum.

Solenogastres do not have true ctenidia, though their gill-like structures may resemble them.

== Development ==
During development, many Solenogastres are covered by a spiny scleritome comprising spines or scale-like plates. This has been likened to the halwaxiid scleritome.

Sclerites of Epimenia start out solid before developing a hollow stem that subsequently solidifies.

Solenogastres can be found in a diverse range of habitats across the world, from the coast to the deep ocean.

== Ecology ==
=== Diet ===
Solenogastres feed on cnidaria and ctenophores, either sucking their bodily fluids or eating their tissue. They do not use their radulae to rasp prey, as some other molluscs do.

== Phylogeny ==
There is some uncertainty regarding the phylogenetic position of the Solenogastres. Traditionally considered to be the most basal molluscan group and the sister group to the Caudofoveata, alternatives to both of these statements have been proposed. Some molecular datasets plot Solenogastres as an outgroup to Mollusca. However, there are cryptic species which are hard to delineate due to there being a lack of multiple morphological characteristics.

== Families ==
- Acanthomeniidae Salvini-Plawen, 1978
- Amphimeniidae Salvini-Plawen, 1972
- Apodomeniidae Kocot, Todt, N. T. Mikkelsen & Halanych, 2019
- Dondersiidae Simroth, 1893
- Drepanomeniidae Salvini-Plawen, 1978
- Epimeniidae Salvini-Plawen, 1978
- Gymnomeniidae Odhner, 1920
- Hemimeniidae Salvini-Plawen, 1978
- Heteroherpiidae Salvini-Plawen, 1978
- Imeroherpiidae Salvini-Plawen, 1978
- Lepidomeniidae Pruvot, 1902
- Macellomeniidae Salvini-Plawen, 1978
- Meiomeniidae Salvini-Plawen, 1985
- Neomeniidae Ihering, 1876
- Notomeniidae Salvini-Plawen, 2004
- Phyllomeniidae Salvini-Plawen, 1978
- Proneomeniidae Mitchell, 1892
- Pruvotinidae Heath, 1911
- Rhipidoherpiidae Salvini-Plawen, 1978
- Rhopalomeniidae Salvini-Plawen, 1978
- Sandalomeniidae Salvini-Plawen, 1978
- Simrothiellidae Salvini-Plawen, 1978
- Strophomeniidae Salvini-Plawen, 1978
- Syngenoherpiidae Salvini-Plawen, 1978

Unassigned in Solenogastres

- Pholidoherpia Salvini-Plawen, 1978
- Rhabdoherpia Salvini-Plawen, 1978

Synonyms

- Superorder Aplotegmentaria (not monophyletic)
  - Myzomeniidae Thiele, 1894: synonym of Dondersiidae Simroth, 1893
- Superorder Pachytegmentaria (not monophyletic)
  - Parameniidae Simroth, 1893: synonym of Pruvotinidae Heath, 1911 (invalid: type genus a junior homonym)
  - Pararrhopaliidae Salvini-Plawen, 1972: synonym of Pruvotinidae Heath, 1911
  - Perimeniidae Nierstrasz, 1908: synonym of Pruvotinidae Heath, 1911
  - Proneomenidae Mitchell, 1892: synonym of Proneomeniidae Mitchell, 1892
  - Pruvotiniidae Heath, 1911: synonym of Pruvotinidae Heath, 1911 (incorrect original spelling)
  - Solenopodidae Koren & Danielssen, 1877: synonym of Neomeniidae Ihering, 1876
  - Wireniidae Salvini-Plawen, 1978: synonym of Gymnomeniidae Odhner, 1920

== Images ==
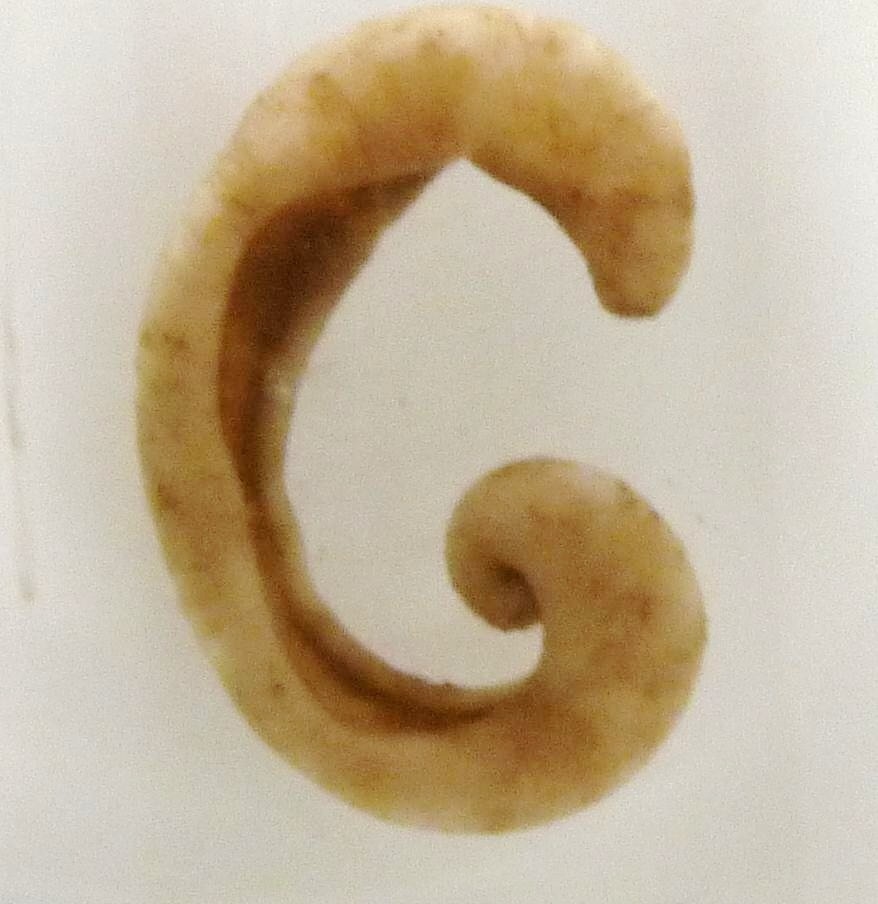
Preserved specimen of Epimenia verrucosa

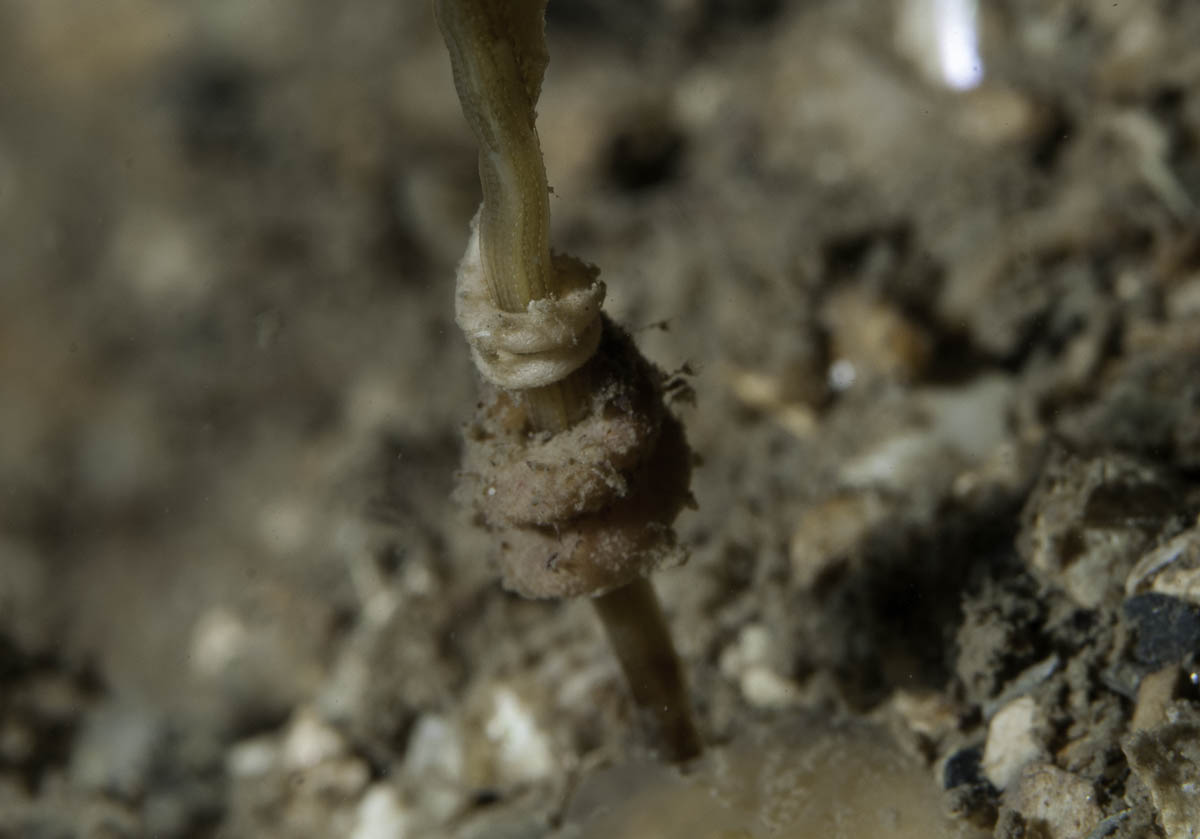
Photograph of Rhopalomenia aglaopheniae, observed off the coast of Scotland
