= Solenogaster =

Scientific classification
- Kingdom: Animalia
- Phylum: Arthropoda
- Clade: Pancrustacea
- Class: Insecta
- Order: Hemiptera
- Suborder: Heteroptera
- Family: Pentatomidae
- Subfamily: Pentatominae
- Tribe: Halyini
- Genus: Solenogaster; Reuter, 1887

Genus of insects

Solenogaster is a genus of shield bugs in the subfamily Pentatominae and tribe Halyini, erected by Odo Reuter in 1887.
