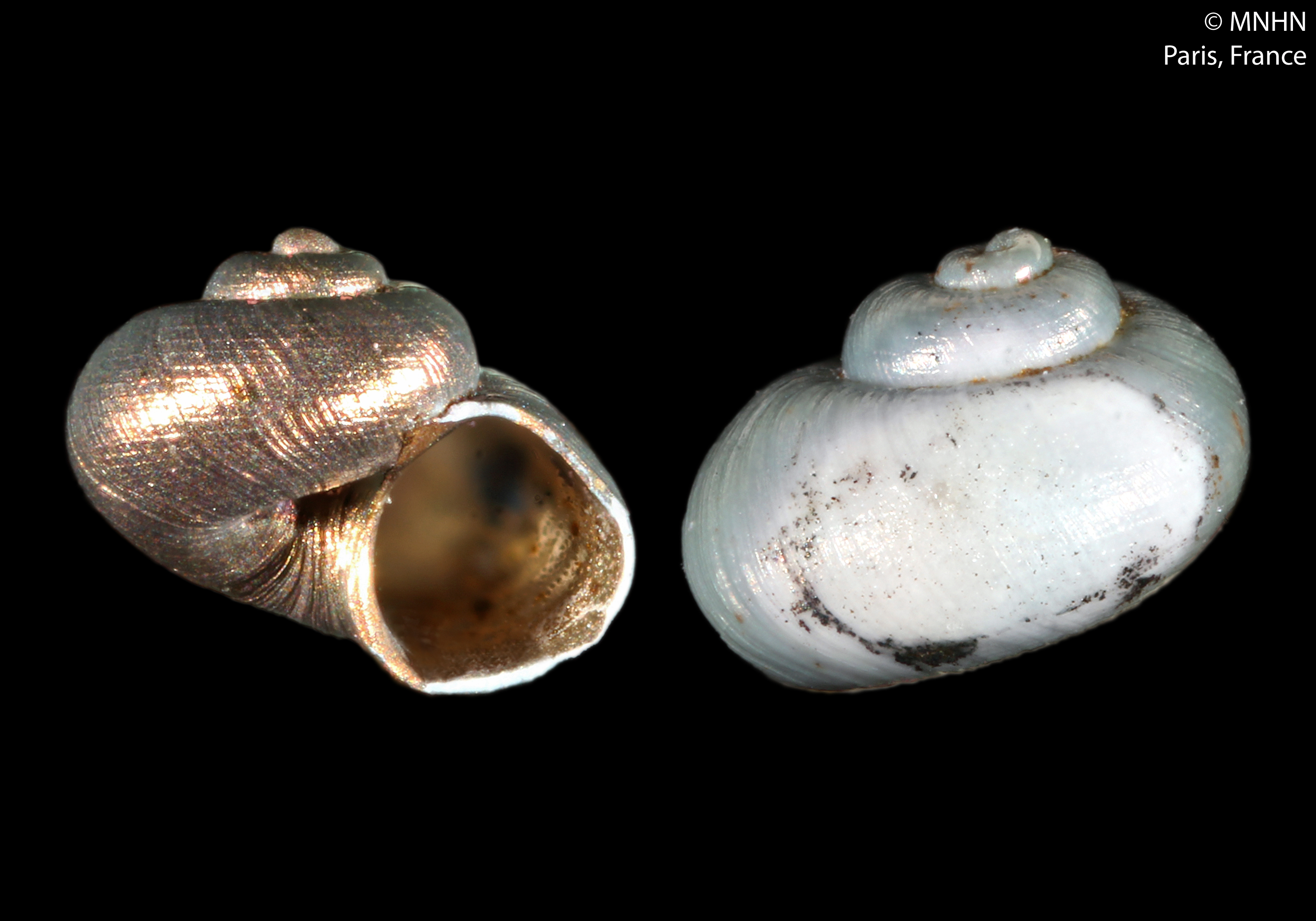
- Shell of Leptogyra inflata (holotype at MNHN, Paris)

Conservation status
- Critically Endangered (IUCN 3.1)

Scientific classification
- Kingdom: Animalia
- Phylum: Mollusca
- Class: Gastropoda
- Subclass: Vetigastropoda
- Family: Melanodrymiidae
- Genus: Leptogyra
- Species: L. inflata

Binomial name
- Leptogyra inflata Warén & Bouchet, 1993

= Leptogyra inflata =

Species of gastropod

Leptogyra inflata is a species of sea snail, a marine gastropod mollusc in the family Melanodrymiidae.

== Description ==
The length of the shell attains 1.32 mm. It has a thin, brownish, multi spiral operculum, with a wide and deep umbilicus.

== Distribution ==
This benthic species occurs off the Fiji Islands at depths between 1,750 to 1,817 metres (5,740 to 5,960 ft).

== Etymology ==
L. inflata is named from the Latin root inflatus, meaning inflated.
