= Melanodrymia aurantiaca =

Conservation status
- Near Threatened (IUCN 3.1)

Scientific classification
- Kingdom: Animalia
- Phylum: Mollusca
- Class: Gastropoda
- Subclass: Vetigastropoda
- Family: Melanodrymiidae
- Genus: Melanodrymia
- Species: M. aurantiaca

Binomial name
- Melanodrymia aurantiaca Hickman, 1984

Species of gastropod

Melanodrymia aurantiaca is a species of sea snail, a marine gastropod mollusc in the family Melanodrymiidae.

== Distribution ==
This benthic marine species is found at depths between 2,500 to 2,800 metres (8,200 to 9,190 ft) in the Pacific Ocean along hydrothermal vents.

== Etymology ==
M. aurantiaca is named after the Latin root auranti, meaning golden.
