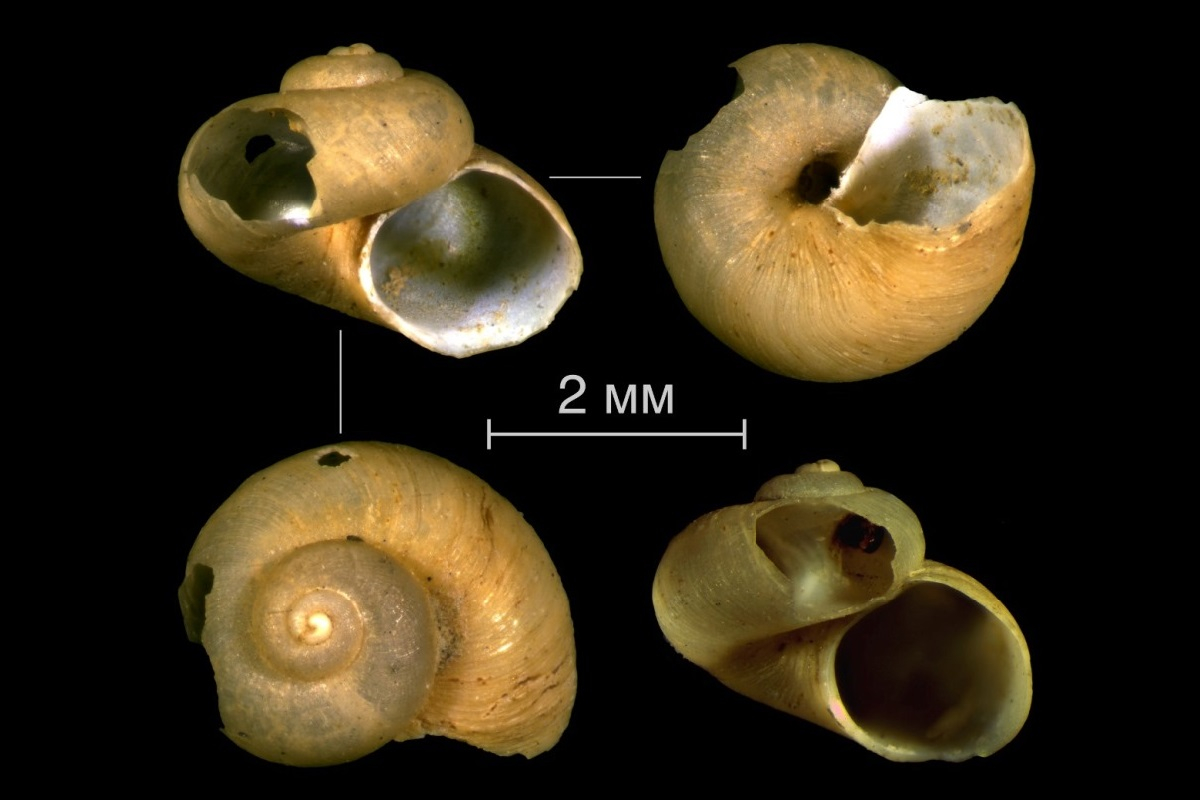

Scientific classification
- Kingdom: Animalia
- Phylum: Mollusca
- Class: Gastropoda
- Subclass: Vetigastropoda
- Family: Melanodrymiidae
- Genus: Leptogyra
- Species: L. bujnitzkii

Binomial name
- Leptogyra bujnitzkii (Gorbunov, 1946)

Synonyms
- Ganesa bujnitzkii Gorbunov, 1946 (basionym); Lissospira bujnitzkii (Gorbunov, 1946) (new combination); Skenea bujnitzkii (Gorbunov, 1946)

= Leptogyra bujnitzkii =

Species of gastropod

Leptogyra bujnitzkii is a species of sea snail, a marine gastropod mollusk in the family Melanodrymiidae.

== Distribution ==
This species is only known from the slope of Lomonosov Ridge, 81°50’N, 136°14’E, 3,700–3,800 m, Arctic Ocean.
