= Melanodrymia brightae =

Conservation status
- Near Threatened (IUCN 3.1)

Scientific classification
- Kingdom: Animalia
- Phylum: Mollusca
- Class: Gastropoda
- Subclass: Vetigastropoda
- Family: Melanodrymiidae
- Genus: Melanodrymia
- Species: M. brightae

Binomial name
- Melanodrymia brightae Warén & Bouchet, 1993

Species of gastropod

Melanodrymia brightae is a species of sea snail, a marine gastropod mollusc in the family Melanodrymiidae.

== Distribution ==
This benthic marine species is found in the pacific northeast at depths of 1,540 to 3,300 metres (5,050 to 10,830 ft) near hydrothermal vents.

== Etymology ==
M. brightae is named after Carole F. Bright.
