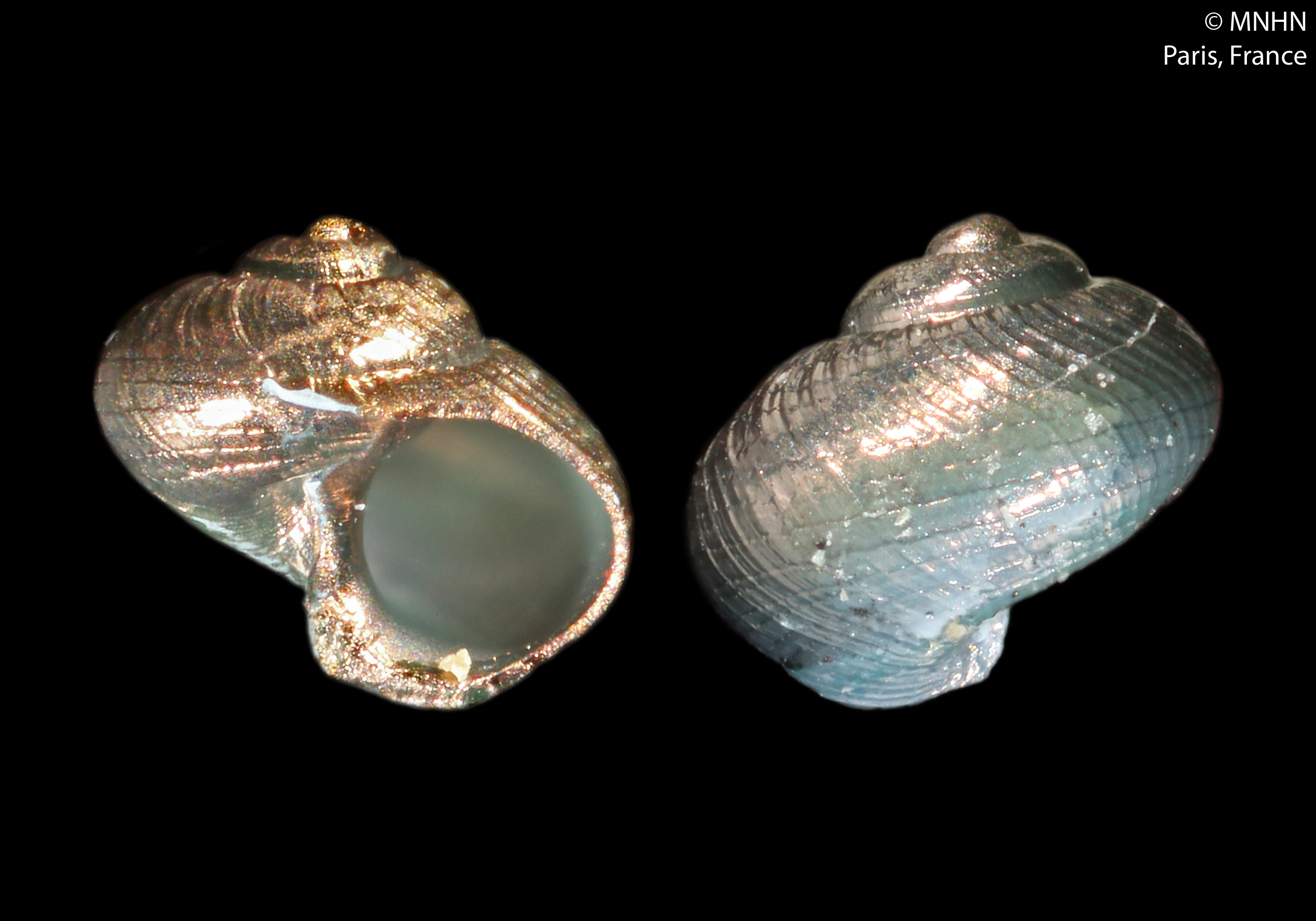
- Shell of Leptogyra costellata (holotype at MNHN, Paris)

Scientific classification
- Kingdom: Animalia
- Phylum: Mollusca
- Class: Gastropoda
- Subclass: Vetigastropoda
- Family: Melanodrymiidae
- Genus: Leptogyra
- Species: L. costellata

Binomial name
- Leptogyra costellata Warén & Bouchet, 2009

= Leptogyra costellata =

Species of gastropod

Leptogyra costellata is a species of sea snail, a marine gastropod mollusc in the family Melanodrymiidae.

== Distribution ==
This species occurs at methane seeps in deep water off the Congo River.
