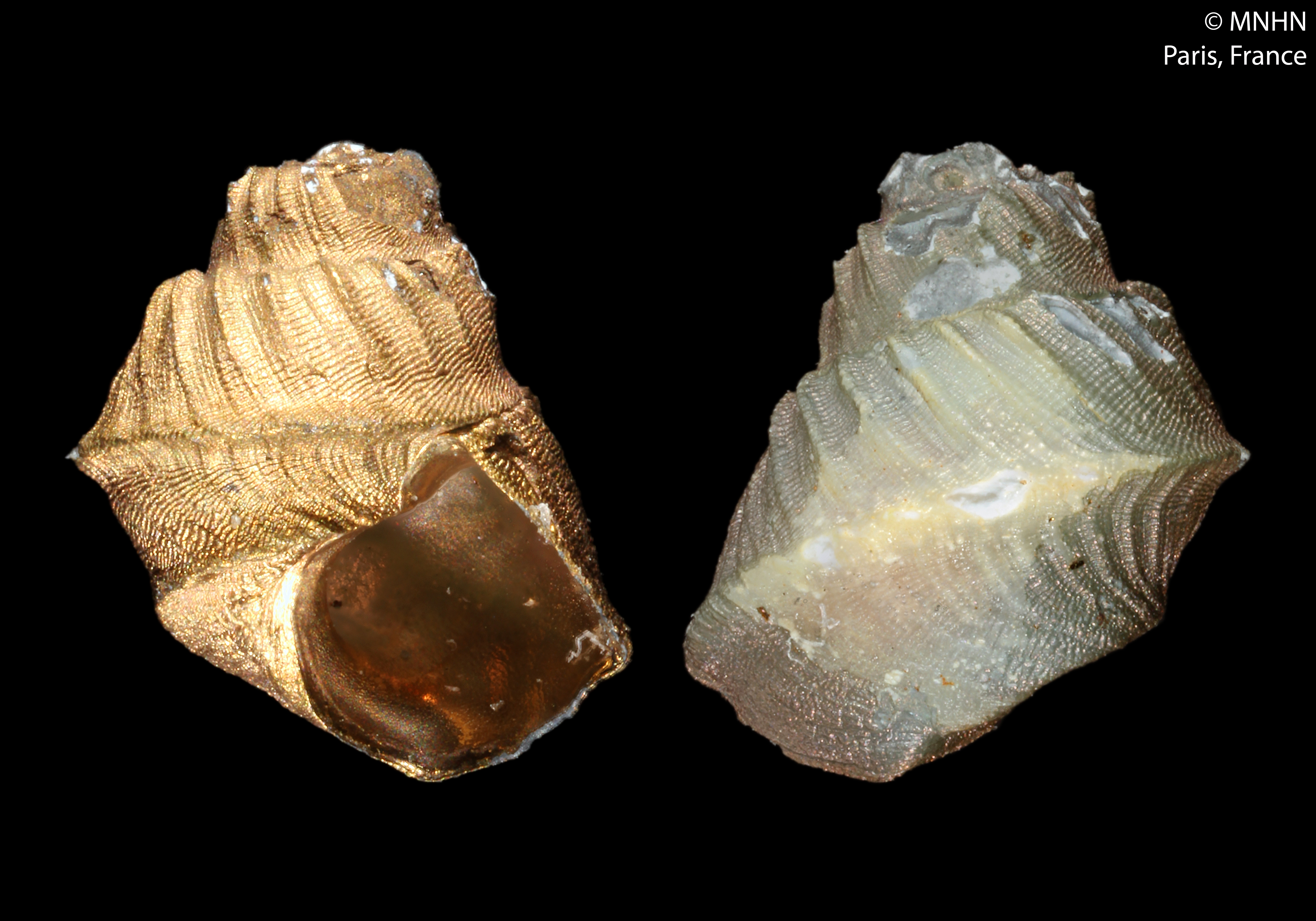
- Shell of Melanodrymia galeronae (holotype at MNHN, Paris)

Conservation status
- Vulnerable (IUCN 3.1)

Scientific classification
- Kingdom: Animalia
- Phylum: Mollusca
- Class: Gastropoda
- Subclass: Vetigastropoda
- Family: Melanodrymiidae
- Genus: Melanodrymia
- Species: M. galeronae

Binomial name
- Melanodrymia galeronae Warén & Bouchet, 2001

= Melanodrymia galeronae =

Species of gastropod

Melanodrymia galeronae is a species of sea snail, a marine gastropod mollusc in the family Melanodrymiidae.

== Description ==
The length of the shell attains 3 millimetres (0.12 in). It is spirallic in shape.

== Distribution ==
This benthic marine species occurs on the East Pacific Rise. It found at depths between 2,600 to 2,845 metres (8,530 to 9,330 ft), near hydrothermal vents.

== Etymology ==
M. galeronae is named after Joëlle Galéron, a chief scientist at IFREMER on the NODINAUT, an oceanographic cruise ship.
