= Leptogyra eritmeta =

Scientific classification
- Kingdom: Animalia
- Phylum: Mollusca
- Class: Gastropoda
- Subclass: Vetigastropoda
- Family: Melanodrymiidae
- Genus: Leptogyra
- Species: L. eritmeta

Binomial name
- Leptogyra eritmeta Bush, 1897

Species of gastropod

Leptogyra eritmeta is a species of sea snail, a marine gastropod mollusc in the family Melanodrymiidae.
