= Leptogyra inconspicua =

Scientific classification
- Kingdom: Animalia
- Phylum: Mollusca
- Class: Gastropoda
- Subclass: Vetigastropoda
- Family: Melanodrymiidae
- Genus: Leptogyra
- Species: L. inconspicua

Binomial name
- Leptogyra inconspicua Bush, 1897

Species of gastropod

Leptogyra inconspicua is a species of sea snail, a marine gastropod mollusc in the family Melanodrymiidae.
