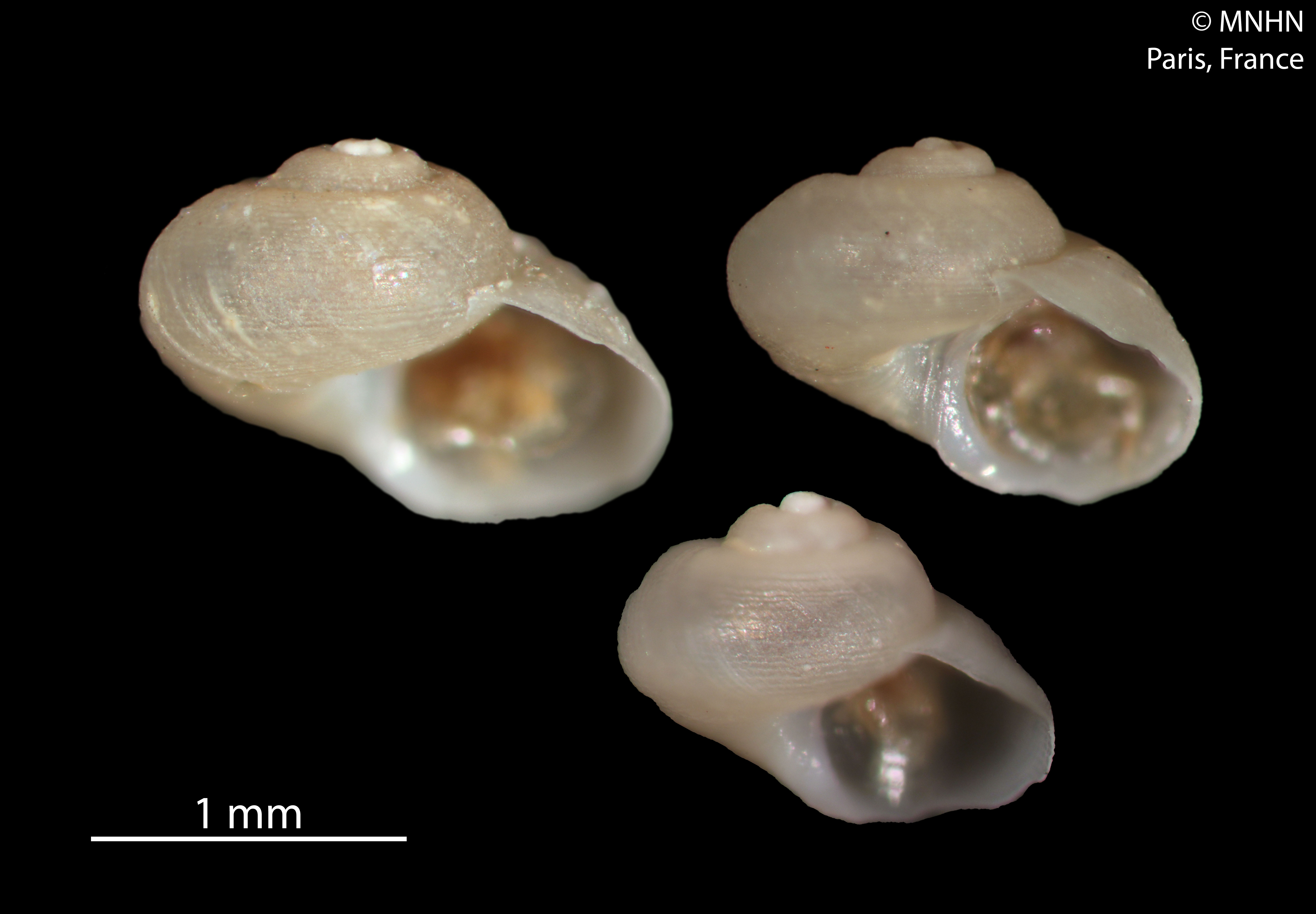
- Shell of Leptogyra constricta (paratype at MNHN, Paris)

Scientific classification
- Kingdom: Animalia
- Phylum: Mollusca
- Class: Gastropoda
- Subclass: Vetigastropoda
- Superfamily: Neomphaloidea
- Family: Melanodrymiidae
- Genus: Leptogyra; Bush, 1897

Type species
- Leptogyra verrilli Bush, 1897

= Leptogyra =

Genus of gastropods

Leptogyra is a genus of sea snails, marine gastropod mollusks in the family Melanodrymiidae, belonging to the clade Neomphalina.

This genus was originally placed in Skeneidae, then in Skeneinae within Turbinidae.

== Species ==
Species within the genus Leptogyra include:

- Leptogyra alaskana Bartsch, 1910
- Leptogyra bujnitzkii (Gorbunov, 1946)
- Leptogyra constricta B. A. Marshall, 1988
- Leptogyra costellata Warén & Bouchet, 2009
- Leptogyra eritmeta Bush, 1897
- Leptogyra inconspicua Bush, 1897
- Leptogyra inflata Warén & Bouchet, 1993
- Leptogyra patula B. A. Marshall, 1988
- Leptogyra verrilli Bush, 1897

Species brought into synonymy

- Leptogyra africana Bartsch, 1915: synonym of Cirsonella africana (Bartsch, 1915) (original combination)
