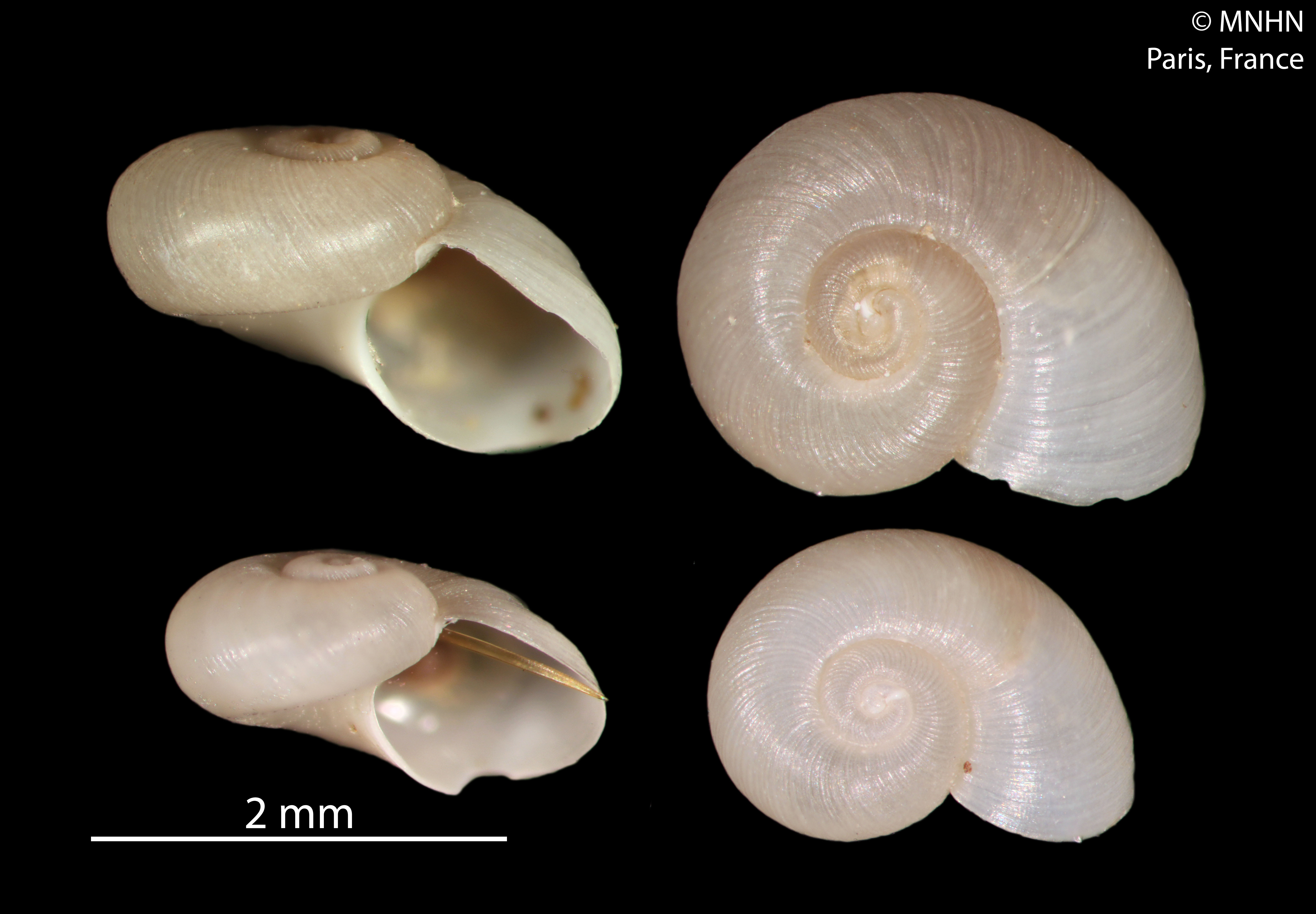
- Shell of Leptogyropsis kalinovoae (paratype at MNHN, Paris)

Scientific classification
- Kingdom: Animalia
- Phylum: Mollusca
- Class: Gastropoda
- Subclass: Vetigastropoda
- Superfamily: Neomphaloidea
- Family: Melanodrymiidae
- Genus: Leptogyropsis; B. A. Marshall, 1988

Type species
- Leptogyropsis kalinovoae B. A. Marshall, 1988

= Leptogyropsis =

Genus of gastropods

Leptogyropsis is a genus of sea snails, marine gastropod mollusks in the family Melanodrymiidae, belonging to the clade Neomphalina.

== Species ==
Species within the genus Leptogyropsis include:

- Leptogyropsis inflata Hasegawa, 1997
- Leptogyropsis kalinovoae B. A. Marshall, 1988
- Leptogyropsis kaltanae B. A. Marshall, 1988
