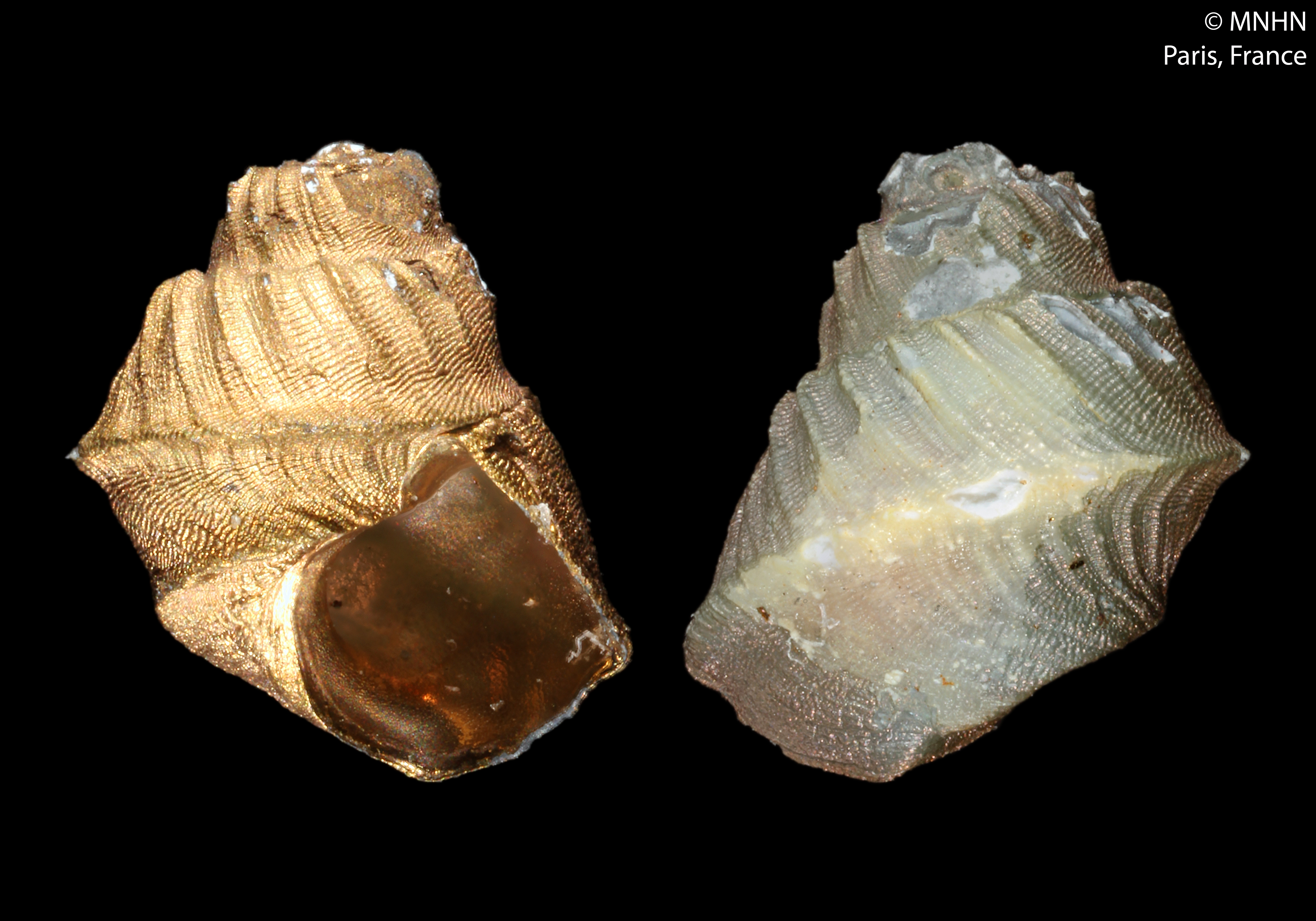
- Shell of Melanodrymia galeronae (holotype at MNHN, Paris)

Scientific classification
- Kingdom: Animalia
- Phylum: Mollusca
- Class: Gastropoda
- Subclass: Vetigastropoda
- Family: Melanodrymiidae
- Genus: Melanodrymia; Hickman, 1984

Type species
- Melanodrymia aurantiaca Hickman, 1984

= Melanodrymia =

Genus of gastropods

Melanodrymia is a genus of sea snails, marine gastropod molluscs in the family Melanodrymiidae.

== Species ==
Species within the genus Melanodrymia include:

- Melanodrymia aurantiaca Hickman, 1984
- Melanodrymia brightae Warén & Bouchet, 1993
- Melanodrymia galeronae Warén & Bouchet, 2001
