= Xyleptogyra =

Scientific classification
- Kingdom: Animalia
- Phylum: Mollusca
- Class: Gastropoda
- Subclass: Vetigastropoda
- Family: Melanodrymiidae
- Genus: Xyleptogyra; Marshall, B.A. (1988)

Genus of gastropods

Xyleptogyra is a genus of sea snail, marine gastropod mollusc in the family Melanodrymiidae.

== Species ==
Species within the Xyleptogyra include:

- Xyleptogyra kapalae Marshall, B.A, 1988
