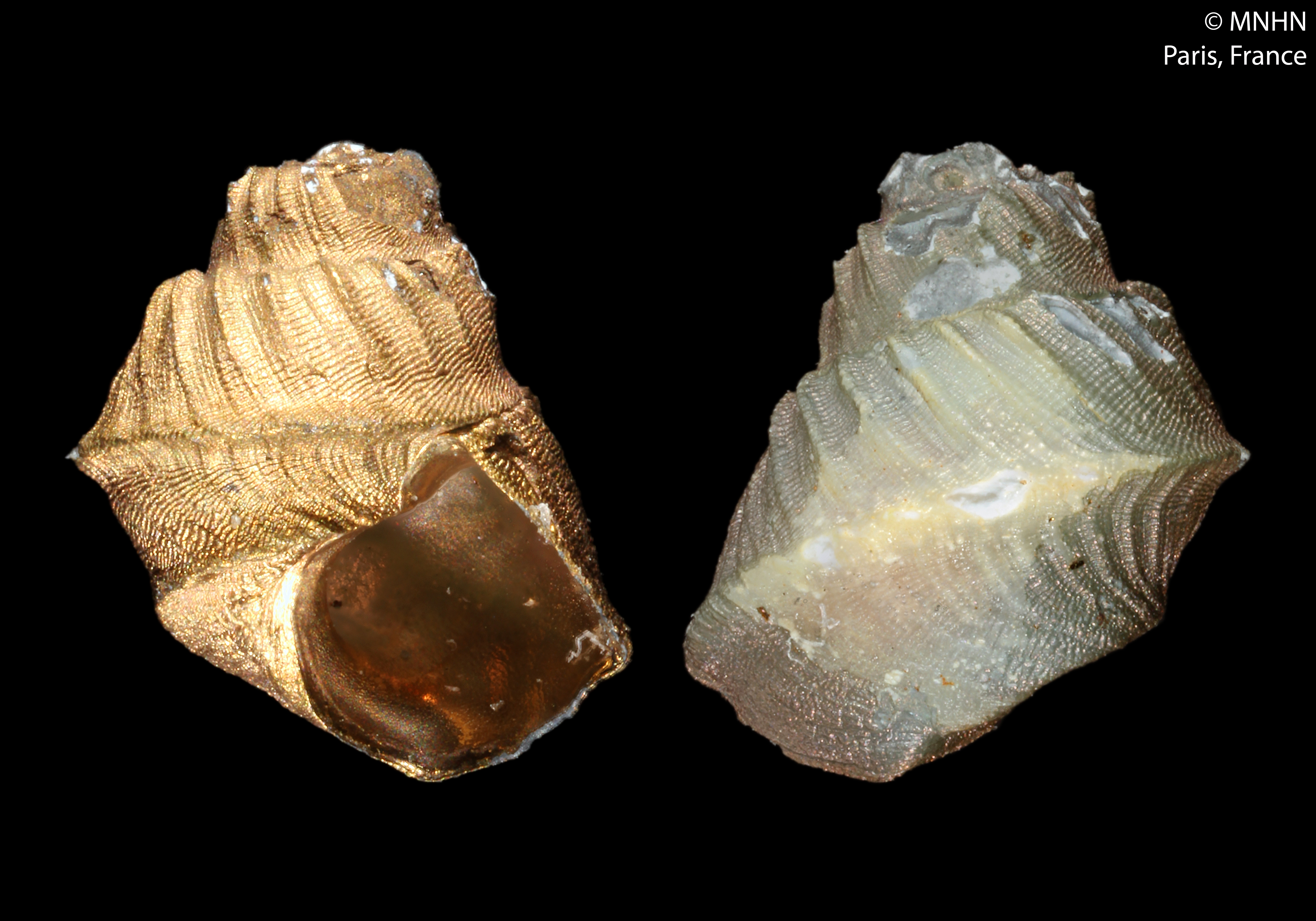
- Melanodrymia galeronae

Scientific classification
- Kingdom: Animalia
- Phylum: Mollusca
- Class: Gastropoda
- Subclass: Vetigastropoda
- Superfamily: Neomphaloidea
- Family: Melanodrymiidae; Salvini-Plawen & Steiner, 1995

Diversity
- 18 extant species

= Melanodrymiidae =

Family of gastropods

Melanodrymiidae is a family of gastropods belonging to the superfamily Neomphaloidea. This family has no subfamilies.

== Genera and species ==
Genera and species within the family Melanodrymiidae include:

- Leptogyra Bush, 1897
- Leptogyropsis Marshall, 1988
- Melanodrymia Hickman, 1984 - type genus
- Xyleptogyra Marshall, 1988
