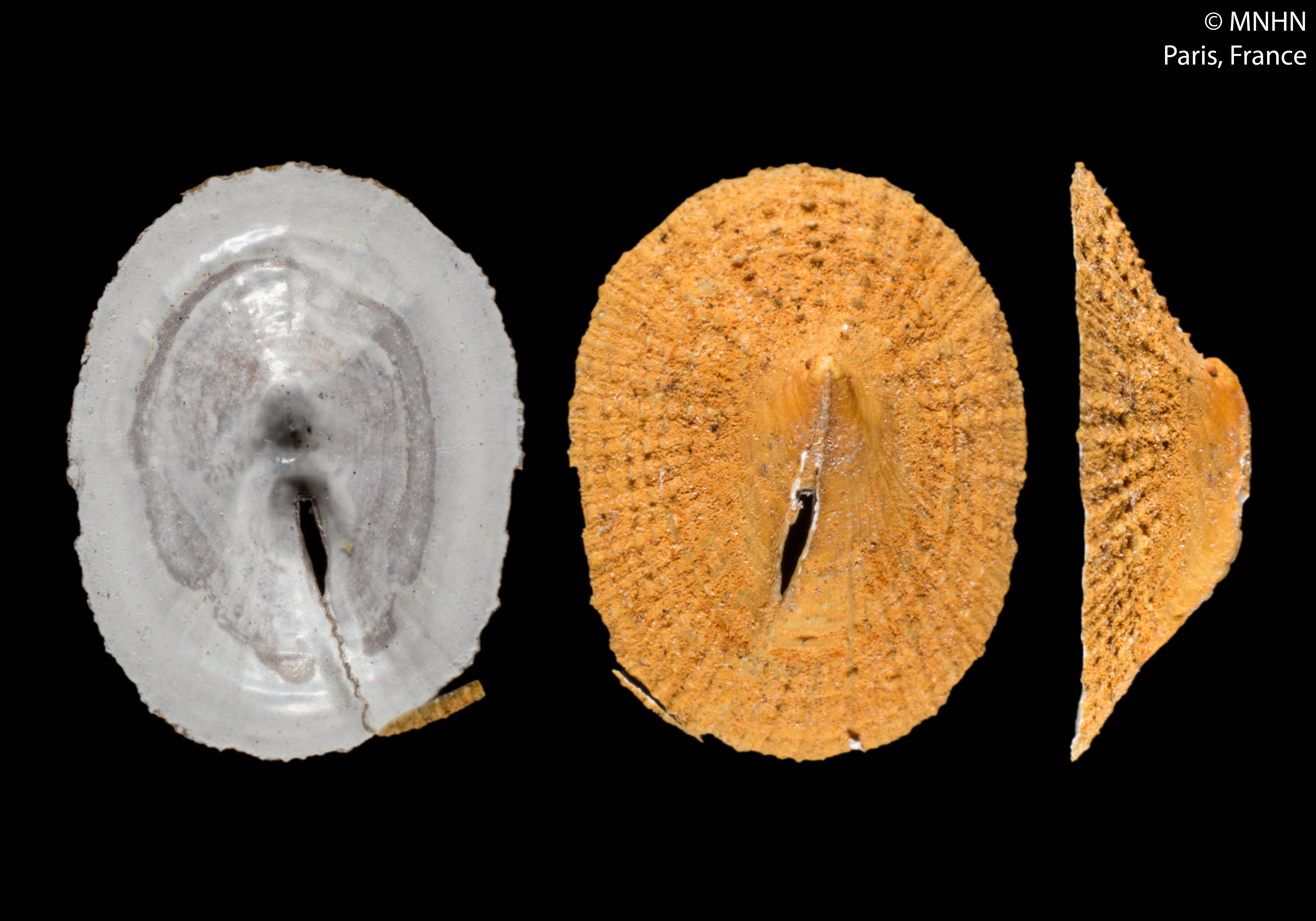
- Shell of Pseudorimula midatlantica

Scientific classification
- Kingdom: Animalia
- Phylum: Mollusca
- Class: Gastropoda
- Subclass: Vetigastropoda
- Order: Lepetellida
- Superfamily: Lepetodriloidea
- Family: Lepetodrilidae
- Genus: Pseudorimula; McLean, 1989

Type species
- Pseudorimula marianae McLean, 1989

Synonyms
- Pseudoraphitoma (Incorrect spelling); Turrella Laseron, 1954

= Pseudorimula =

Genus of gastropods

Pseudorimula is a genus of sea snails, marine gastropod molluscs in the family Lepetodrilidae.

== Species ==
Species within the genus Pseudorimula include:

- Pseudorimula leisei L. Beck, 2023
- Pseudorimula marianae McLean, 1989
- Pseudorimula midatlantica McLean, 1992
