= Pseudorimula marianae =

Scientific classification
- Kingdom: Animalia
- Phylum: Mollusca
- Class: Gastropoda
- Subclass: Vetigastropoda
- Order: Lepetellida
- Family: Lepetodrilidae
- Genus: Pseudorimula
- Species: P. marianae

Binomial name
- Pseudorimula marianae McLean, 1989

Species of gastropod

Pseudorimula marianae is a species of sea snail, a marine gastropod mollusc in the family Lepetodrilidae.

== Distribution ==
This species occurs in hydrothermal vents and seeps of the Snail Pit vents, Mariana Back-Arc Basin, West Pacific
