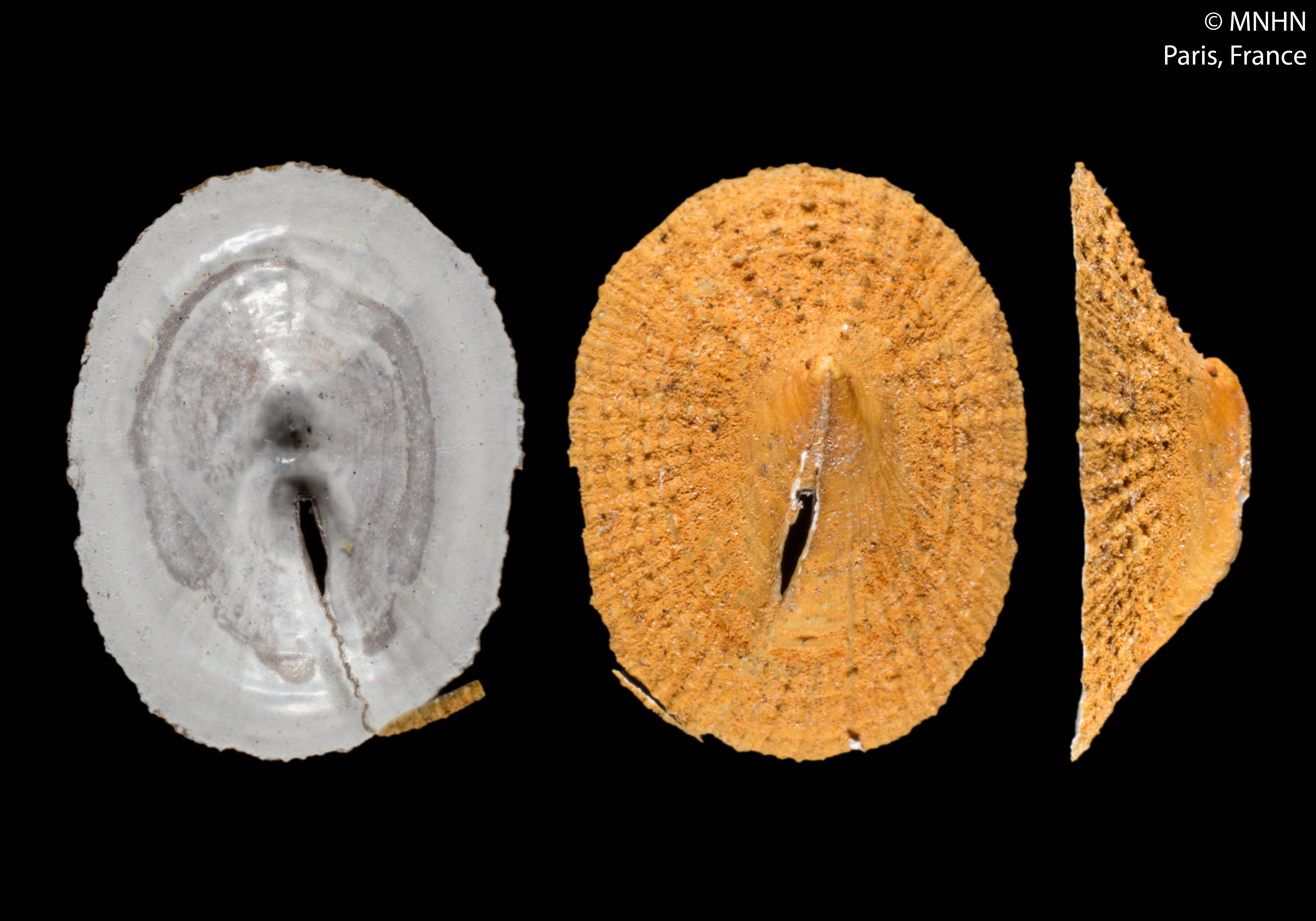
- Shell of Pseudorimula midatlantica (holotype at MNHN, Paris)

Scientific classification
- Kingdom: Animalia
- Phylum: Mollusca
- Class: Gastropoda
- Subclass: Vetigastropoda
- Order: Lepetellida
- Family: Lepetodrilidae
- Genus: Pseudorimula
- Species: P. midatlantica

Binomial name
- Pseudorimula midatlantica McLean, 1992

= Pseudorimula midatlantica =

Species of gastropod

Pseudorimula midatlantica is a species of sea snail, a marine gastropod mollusc in the family Lepetodrilidae.

== Distribution ==
This species occurs in hydrothermal vents and seeps in the Snake Pit hydrothermal field, Mid-Atlantic Ridge.

== Description ==
The maximum recorded shell length is 8.1 mm.

== Habitat ==
Minimum recorded depth is 1622 m. Maximum recorded depth is 3520 m.
