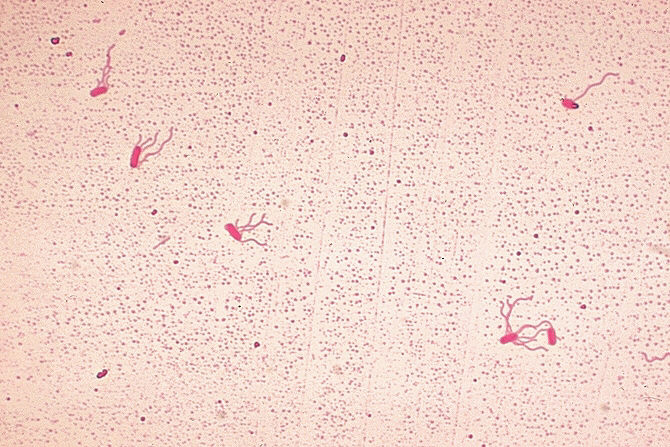
- Alcaligenes faecalis, flagella stain

Scientific classification
- Domain: Bacteria
- Kingdom: Pseudomonadati
- Phylum: Pseudomonadota
- Class: Betaproteobacteria
- Order: Burkholderiales
- Family: Alcaligenaceae
- Genus: Alcaligenes; Castellani & Chalmers 1919

Species
- A. aquatilis; A. endopyhticus; A. faecalis; A. nematophilus; A. pakistanensis

= Alcaligenes =

Genus of bacteria

Alcaligenes is a genus of Gram-negative, aerobic, rod-shaped bacteria in the order of Burkholderiales, family Alcaligenaceae.

== History ==
The type species, A. faecalis, was first isolated from stale beer by Johannes Petruschky in 1896. However, formal description was only finished in 1919 by Castellani and Chalmers. The name Alcaligenes has its origin in Arabic and Greek and means "alkali-producing".

Several species were previously placed in Alcaligenes, but have since been moved to more appropriate genera. A. aestus, A. aquamarinus, A. cupidus, A. pacificus and A. venustus were first reclassified to the genus Deleya and later merged into Halomonas in the class of Gammaproteobacteria. Other species were reassigned within the order of Burkholderiales. A. denitrificans, A. piechaudii, A. ruhlandii and A. xylosoxidans are currently placed in Achromobacter, A. latus in Azohydromonas, A. eutrophus in Wautersia, and A. paradoxus in Variovorax.

== Morphology and biochemistry ==
Species of Alcaligenes are rods, coccal rods, or cocci, sized at about 0.5-1.0 x 0.5-2.6 μm. The slender rods are slightly curved, capsule forming, not spore-forming. They are usually motile with amphitrichous flagella and rarely nonmotile. They tend to be colorless.

Alcaligenes species are obligately aerobic, but some can undergo anaerobic respiration if nitrate is present. They are non-fermenting.

Alcaligenes species have been used for the industrial production of nonstandard amino acids.

== Biology and pathogenesis ==
Species of Alcaligenes typically occur in soil and water or decaying materials and dairy products. A. faecalis is commonly found in the intestinal tracts of vertebrates, and is found as a harmless saprophyte in 5% – 19% of the human population.

Infections from Alcaligenes species are uncommon and largely opportunistic. A. faecalis is a known causing agent of nosocomial bacterial sepsis in immunocompromised patients by contaminated hemodialysis or intravenous fluid. Cases of meningitis, peritonitis, enteric fever, appendicitis, cystitis, chronic suppurative otitis media, abscesses, arthritis, pneumonitis and endocarditis associated with Alcaligenes have been reported, including a zoonotic infection from ferrets. An increased recovery rate of Alcaligenes species from patients with cystic fibrosis was reported in 2001, though the most commonly identified strain A. cylosoxidans has since been transferred to Achromobacter.

A. faecalis infections can pose a challenge due to considerable resistance to commonly used antibiotics. The resistance is driven by the production of β-lactamases (such as OXA-10 and PER-1), efflux pumps like the AcrAB-TolC system, and mutations in the gyrA and parC genes, which decrease fluoroquinolone effectiveness. The bacterium also forms biofilms on medical devices, providing protection against both antibiotics and the host immune system. In recent years, extensively drug-resistant (XDR) strains have emerged, showing very limited susceptibility to most available antibiotics.
