= Halomonas nitroreducens =

Scientific classification
- Domain: Bacteria
- Kingdom: Pseudomonadati
- Phylum: Pseudomonadota
- Class: Gammaproteobacteria
- Order: Oceanospirillales
- Family: Halomonadaceae
- Genus: Halomonas
- Species: H. nitroreducens

Binomial name
- Halomonas nitroreducens González-Domenech et al. 2008

Species of bacterium

Halomonas nitroreducens is a Gram-negative halophilic Pseudomonadota, that is able to respire on nitrate and nitrite in anaerobiosis.

Halomonas nitroreducens's closest relatives are Halomonas alimentaria, H. denitrificans, H. organivorans, and H. ventosa. The bacterium was studied taxonomically from a strain taken from a solar saltern in Cáhuil, Pichilemu, Chile, by the University of Granada.
