= Glycine betaine monooxygenase =

Oxidoreductase

Glycine Betaine Monooxygenase
Identifiers
EC No.	1.14.13.251
Databases
BRENDA	BRENDA:EC1.14.13.251
PDB (BmoA)	AF_AFQ9HTF4F1
PDB (BmoB)	AF_AFQ9HTF3F1
Uniprot (BmoA)	GBMOO_PSEAE
Uniprot (BmoB)	GBMOR_PSEAE
Alphafold Structure	P. aeruginosa Glycine Betaine Monooxygenase

Glycine betaine monooxygenase (EC 1.14.13.251) is a specific enzyme in the enzyme class Oxidoreductases. Its main function is to break one methyl group off of glycine betaine, also known as trimethylglycine, to make N,N-dimethylglycine, formaldehyde, and water. Glycine betaine is an osmolyte produced by plants during periods of abiotic stress, but can also be used as both an osmolyte as well as a carbon source in bacteria such as Chromohalobacter salexigens. Notably, C. salexigens can use glycine betaine monooxygenase to harvest enough energy from glycine betaine that it can be used as the bacterium's sole carbon source.

== Enzyme specific reaction ==
Glycine betaine monooxygenase is the first enzyme in the glycine betaine degradation pathway. It serves to cleave one methyl group (CH_{3}–) from glycine betaine in the following reaction:

Glycine betaine + NADH + H^{+} + O_{2} → N,N-dimethylglycine + formaldehyde (CH_{2}O) + NAD^{+} + water (H_{2}O)

This reaction is not yet exergonic, rather it takes an NADH to operate requiring energy from the cell. However, it is only the first step of five to break down glycine betaine into a pyruvate molecule that can be used in the citric acid cycle to make adenine triphosphate (ATP) for broad energy use. This makes the entire degradation pathway of glycine betaine exergonic. The conversion of glycine betaine into pyruvate is similar to the process of glycolysis that produces two pyruvates from carbohydrates, the difference is in the carbon source that each of these pathways use.

== Organisms that use glycine betaine monooxygenase ==
Glycine betaine monooxygenase has been found in two bacteria species so far: Chromohalobacter salexigens and Pseudomonas aeruginosa.

C. salexigens is a halophilic bacteria found in marine environments. One of the reasons it is so successful in salty environments is because it can use glycine betaine as an osmolyte to regulate the flow of water in/out of the cell. With Glycine betaine monooxygenase, C. salexigens can also consume glycine betaine as a form of food.

P. aeruginosa uses glycine betaine monooxygenase for a similar purpose, though it can be found in many soils across the world. glycine betaine is thought to serve primarily as a osmoregulator in P. aeruginosa, though with as prolific the species is, it is no surprise P. aeruginosa has the ability to metabolize glycine betaine as well.

== Structure ==
The structure of glycine betaine monooxygenase for both C. salexigens and P. aeruginosa has been computer generated using Deepmind's Alpha Fold 3, but no crystal structure has been experimentally found. Most of the testing of structure and function however has been characterized from the P. aeruginosa enzyme.

Glycine betaine monooxygenase is composed of two subunits: a terminal oxygenase component (GbcA/BmoA). and a ferredoxin reductase component (GbcB/BmoB) BmoA contains the primary binding site for the whole protein complex utilizing an iron (Fe^{2+}) and sulfur complex to catalyze the nucleophilic attack of molecular oxygen on glycine betaine and make formaldehyde. The binding site on BmoA is known as a Rieske-type center, and is similar to a subunit of choline monooxygenase. Notably, choline is a precursor to glycine betaine is some systems.

The BmoB ferredoxin reductase subunit serves to shuttle electrons through the enzyme to glycine betaine in order to bind a hydrogen atom to glycine betaine. NADH binds to the BmoB subunit as a source of electrons for the demethylation of glycine betaine.

== Future Work ==
According to the sequences of both C. salexigens and P. aeruginosa on the Uniprot database, the BmoA subunits have a similarity of about 67%, while the BmoB subunits have a similarity of about 76%. So far, the two different sequences are considered the same enzyme; however, further testing is needed in order to confirm this assumption. Furthermore, for both species, the BmoA and BmoB subunits have been characterized separately. The lack of an experimental crystal structure for either subunit or the entire enzyme leaves research to be desired for glycine betaine monooxygenase.
