= Halomonas meridiana =

Scientific classification
- Domain: Bacteria
- Kingdom: Pseudomonadati
- Phylum: Pseudomonadota
- Class: Gammaproteobacteria
- Order: Oceanospirillales
- Family: Halomonadaceae
- Genus: Halomonas
- Species: H. meridiana

Binomial name
- Halomonas meridiana James et al. 1990

Species of bacterium

Halomonas meridiana (H. meridiana) is a bacterial species discovered in 1990 in the hypersaline lakes of Vestfold Hills, Antarctica.

== Taxonomy ==
Halomonas meridiana is a Gram-negative microorganism of the family Halomonadaceae. There are several known strains of this microbe including DSM 5425, ACAM 246, ATCC 49692, and CIP 104043. It shares many characteristics with other species in the same genus. H. meridiana was placed in this genus due to its halophillic nature as well as its close genomic relation to others in the same taxa. This species shares a close relationship with the known species Halomonas elongate, Halomonas halmophila, and Halomonas subglaciescola.

== Characteristics/morphology ==
Halomonas meridiana is a Gram-negative halophilic organism found in the lakes of Antarctica. It is a rod-shaped cell with rounded ends, and it has peritrichous, all over the surface, flagella. It is between 2 and 3 micrometers in length and 1 micrometer wide. This organism has an average genome currently sized 3.8 mega base pairs (Mbp) containing 56.96% GC's, or guanine and cytosine content. It has 3,864 genes of which 3,696 of those genes are protein coding. H. meridiana is a commensal marine bacteria that is found living on reef-building corals as part of their surface microbiome. It is not known to be pathogenic. Halomonas meridiana is a heterotrophic organism capable of anaerobic growth with the aid of glucose when nitrogen is not present.

== Discovery ==
In 1997, James et al. published a paper describing an organism they had discovered. It was found in the Vestfold Hills, Antarctica salt lakes, which contained many undescribed microbes including this organism. Water from the lake was placed on agar plates and incubated. After allowing time for growth, single cells were removed from colonies and grown on new agar places. After 2–4 weeks of incubation, colonies were transferred to a basal media designed to simulate an organic lake. Many species of microorganisms and several strains of what would later be identified as Halomonas meridiana were found and tested for physical and chemical characteristics using quantitative phylogenetic techniques. James et al. mapped the results of DNA base composition, salt tolerance, and temperature tolerance tests against those of other known organisms of the same family. After careful study, they determined that the organism they had found was different from the rest. They placed the organism in the genus Halomonas. In addition to Antarctica, Halomonas meridiana was also isolated from the host of organisms found living in and on coral, Acropora, across the world. The found organism was identified as Halomonas meridiana using sequences of parts of the 16S rRNA gene. The word Halomonas comes from the Greek word halos meaning "salt" and monas meaning "unit" and The word meridiana comes from the word meridian meaning "of or belonging to the south".

== Importance ==
This species helps expand our knowledge of the importance of heterotrophic bacteria that live in a symbiotic relationship with other organisms. This organism is a symbiont that lives on the surface of coral reefs. Halomonas meridiana was discovered living on the surface of the species Acropora, which are reef building coral. Halomonas meridiana also produces proteases. These metalloproteases specific to marine bacteria are important for cleavage of connective tissues as well as adhesion of detachment to mucus. The alkaline proteases are important aspects of the processes involving detergents, leather, food, and silk for consumer consumption.

Halomonas meridiana was an important organism used in defining the new term, haloversatile. H. meridiana exhibits properties of both halotolerant and slightly halophilic bacteria, and as a result a new term, haloversatile, describes the salinity tolerance of this organism better than the traditional terms. Halotolerant and halophilic bacteria, like H. meridiana can also provide valuable information about species that have been adapted to the salt lakes in cold temperatures as well as retaining the ability to live in symbiosis with other organisms.
