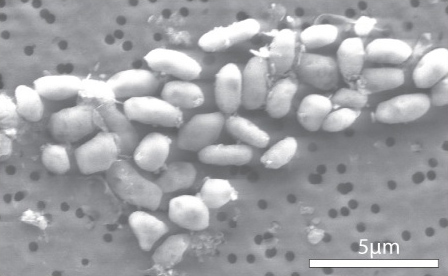
- Magnified cells of bacterium GFAJ-1 grown in medium containing arsenate.

Scientific classification
- Domain: Bacteria
- Phylum: Pseudomonadota
- Class: Gammaproteobacteria
- Order: Oceanospirillales
- Family: Halomonadaceae
- Genus: Vreelandella

Trinomial name
- Vreelandella sp. GFAJ-1

Synonyms
- Halomonas sp. GFAJ-1

= GFAJ-1 =

Strain of bacteria

GFAJ-1 is a strain of rod-shaped bacteria in the family Halomonadaceae. It is an extremophile that was isolated from the hypersaline and alkaline Mono Lake in eastern California by geobiologist Felisa Wolfe-Simon, a NASA research fellow in residence at the US Geological Survey. In a 2010 Science journal publication, the authors claimed that the microbe, when starved of phosphorus, is capable of substituting arsenic for a small percentage of its phosphorus to sustain its growth. Immediately after publication, other microbiologists and biochemists expressed doubt about this claim, which was robustly criticized in the scientific community. Subsequent independent studies published in 2012 found no detectable arsenate in the DNA of GFAJ-1, refuted the claim, and demonstrated that GFAJ-1 is simply an arsenate-resistant, phosphate-dependent organism. The paper was retracted by the Science journal in 2025.

== Discovery ==
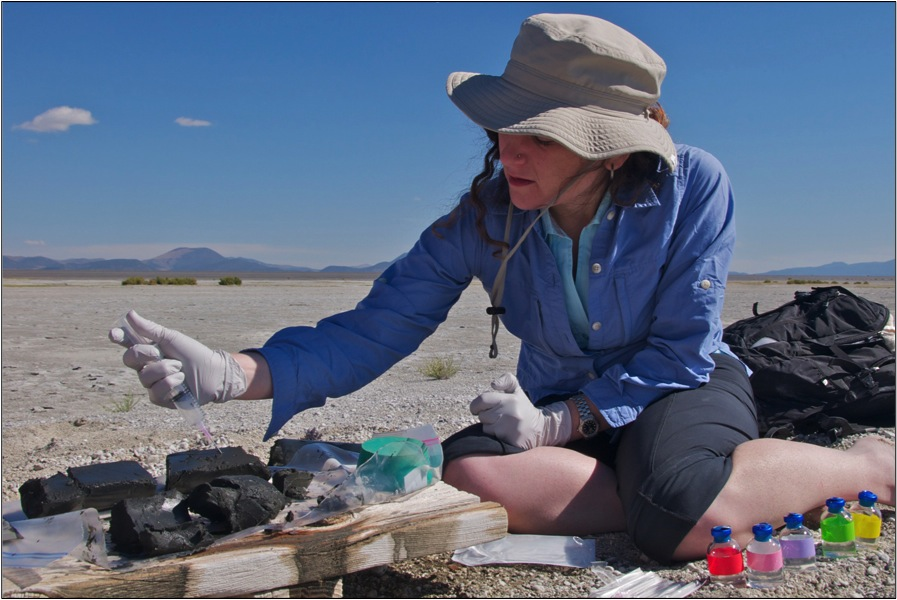
Wolfe-Simon at Mono Lake, 2010

The GFAJ-1 bacterium was discovered by geomicrobiologist Felisa Wolfe-Simon, a NASA astrobiology fellow in residence at the US Geological Survey in Menlo Park, California. GFAJ stands for "Give Felisa a Job". The organism was isolated and cultured beginning in 2009 from samples she and her colleagues collected from sediments at the bottom of Mono Lake, California, U.S.A. Mono Lake is hypersaline (about 90 grams/liter) and highly alkaline (pH 9.8). It also has one of the highest natural concentrations of arsenic in the world (200 μM). The discovery was widely publicized on 2 December 2010.

== Taxonomy and phylogeny ==
- - - Escherichia coli strain O157:H7
    - - - - Halomonas alkaliphila
          - Halomonas venusta strain NBSL13
          - GFAJ-1
          - Halomonas sp. GTW
          - Halomonas sp. G27
        - - Halomonas sp. DH77
          - Halomonas sp. mp3
      - - Halomonas sp. IB-O18
        - Halomonas sp. ML-185

Phylogeny of GFAJ-1 based on ribosomal DNA sequences, according to Wolfe-Simon et al.

Molecular analysis based on 16S rRNA sequences shows GFAJ-1 to be closely related to other moderate halophile ("salt-loving") bacteria of the family Halomonadaceae. Although the authors produced a cladogram in which the strain is nested among members of Halomonas, including H. alkaliphila and H. venusta, they did not explicitly assign the strain to that genus. Many bacteria are known to be able to tolerate high levels of arsenic, and to have a proclivity to take it up into their cells. However, GFAJ-1 was controversially proposed to go a step further; when starved of phosphorus, it was proposed to instead incorporate arsenic into its metabolites and macromolecules and continue growing.

The sequence of the genome of the bacterium GFAJ-1 is now posted in GenBank.

=== Species or strain ===
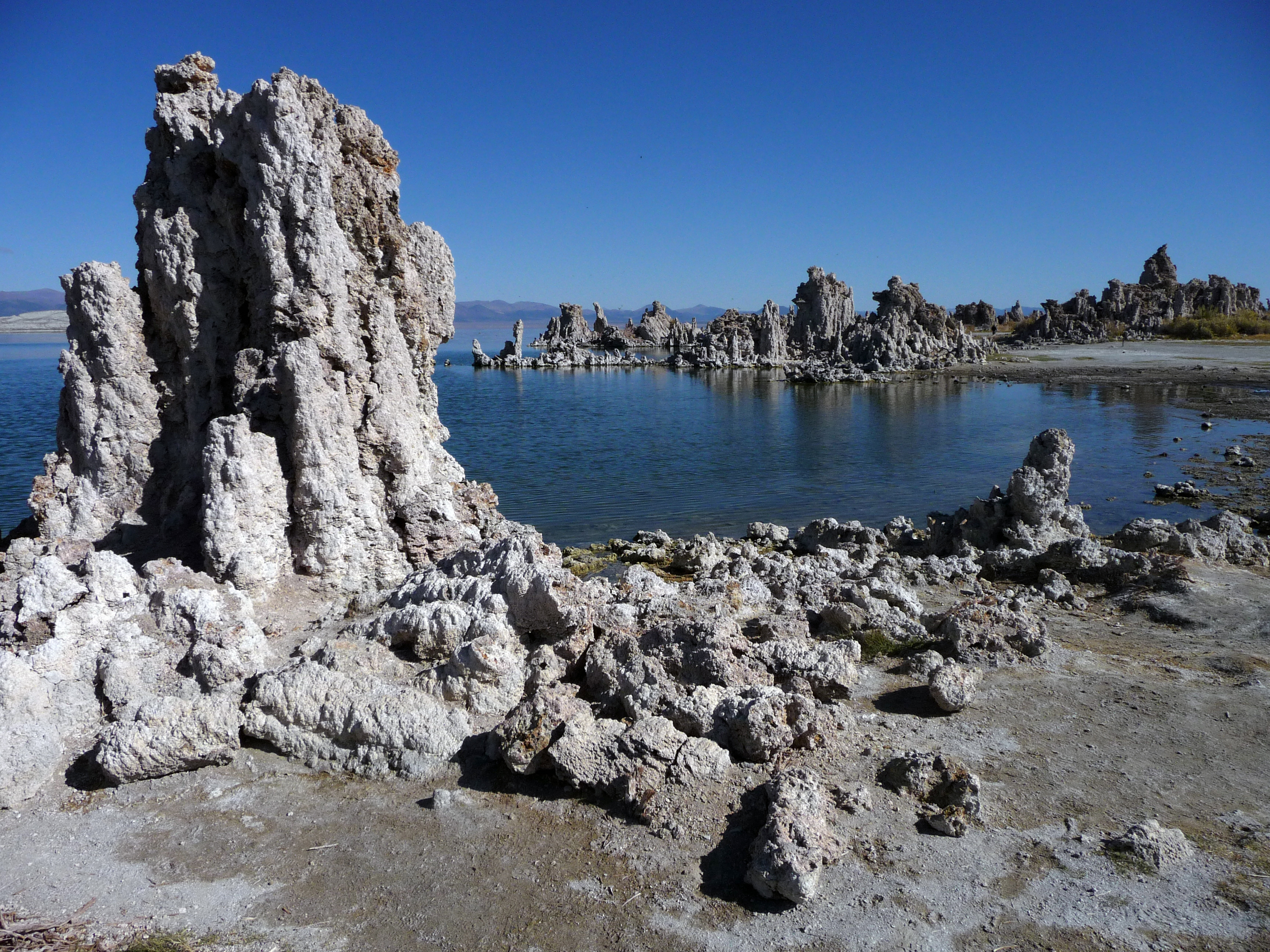
Tufa formations along the shore of Mono Lake

In the Science journal article, GFAJ-1 is referred to as a strain of Halomonadaceae and not as a new species. The International Code of Nomenclature of Bacteria, the set of regulations which govern the naming of bacteria, and certain articles in the International Journal of Systematic and Evolutionary Microbiology contain the guidelines and minimal standards to describe a new species, e.g. the minimal standards to describe a member of the Halomonadaceae. Organisms are described as new species if they meet certain physiological and genetic conditions, such as generally less than 97% 16S rRNA sequence identity to other known species and metabolic differences allowing them to be discerned apart. In addition to indicators to tell the novel species from other species, other analyses are required, such as fatty acid composition, respiratory quinone used and tolerance ranges and deposition of the strain in at least two microbiological repositories. New proposed names are given in italics followed by sp. nov. (and gen. nov. if it is a novel genus according to the descriptions of that clade).

In the instance of the GFAJ-1 strain these criteria are not met, and the strain is not claimed to be a new species. When a strain is not assigned to a species (e.g. due to insufficient data or choice) it is often labeled as the genus name followed by "sp." (i.e., undetermined species of that genus) and the strain name. In the case of GFAJ-1 the authors chose to refer to the strain by strain designation only. Strains closely related to GFAJ-1 include Halomonas sp. GTW and Halomonas sp. G27, neither of which were described as valid species. If the authors had formally assigned strain GFAJ-1 to the genus Halomonas, the name would be given as Halomonas sp. GFAJ-1.

Until release R220, the Genome Taxonomy Database assigned GFAJ-1 its own tentative species, Halomonas sp002966495. This means that the strain falls into Halomonas phylogenetically, and its whole-genome similarity compared to other defined species of the genus is low enough. Neither strain GTW nor strain G27 has a genome available for the database to run its classification. In release R220, the databased moved the strain to Vreelandella, a new genus published in 2023 (and validated in 2024).

== Biochemistry ==
A phosphorus-free growth medium (which actually contained 3.1 ± 0.3 μM of residual phosphate, from impurities in reagents) was used to culture the bacteria in a regime of increasing exposure to arsenate; the initial level of 0.1 mM was eventually ramped up to 40 mM. Alternative media used for comparative experiments contained either high levels of phosphate (1.5 mM) with no arsenate, or had neither added phosphate nor added arsenate. It was observed that GFAJ-1 could grow through many doublings in cell numbers when cultured in either phosphate or arsenate media, but could not grow when placed in a medium of a similar composition to which neither phosphate nor arsenate was added. The phosphorus content of the arsenic-fed, phosphorus-starved bacteria (as measured by ICP-MS) was only 0.019 (± 0.001) % by dry weight, one thirtieth of that when grown in phosphate-rich medium. This phosphorus content was also only about one tenth of the cells' average arsenic content (0.19 ± 0.25% by dry weight). The arsenic content of cells as measured by ICP-MS varies widely and can be lower than the phosphorus contents in some experiments, and up to fourteen times higher in others. Other data from the same study obtained with nano-SIMS suggest a ~75-fold excess of phosphate (P) over arsenic (As) when expressed as P:C and As:C ratios, even in cells grown with arsenate and no added phosphate. When cultured in the arsenate solution, GFAJ-1 only grew 60% as fast as it did in phosphate solution. The phosphate-starved bacteria had an intracellular volume 1.5 times normal; the greater volume appeared to be associated with the appearance of large "vacuole-like regions".

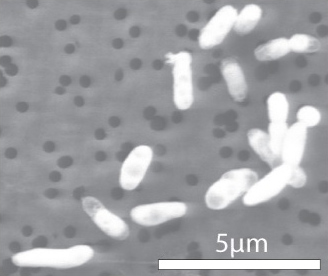
Scanning electron micrograph of GFAJ-1 cells grown in defined minimal medium supplemented with 1.5 mM phosphate

Nucleic acids from stationary phase cells starved of phosphorus were concentrated via five extractions (one with phenol, three with phenol-chloroform and one with chloroform extraction solvent), followed by ethanol precipitation. Although direct evidence of the incorporation of arsenic into biomolecules is still lacking, radioactivity measurements suggested that approximately one-tenth (11.0 ± 0.1%) of the arsenic absorbed by these bacteria ended up in the fraction that contained the nucleic acids (DNA and RNA) and all other co-precipitated compounds not extracted by the previous treatments. A comparable control experiment with isotope-labeled phosphate was not performed. With the distribution of the strain in mid-2011, other labs began to independently test the validity of the discovery. Rosemary Redfield from the University of British Columbia, following issues with the growth conditions, investigated the growth requirements of GFAJ-1, and found that the strain grows better on solid agar medium than in liquid culture. Redfield attributed this to low potassium levels and hypothesized that the potassium levels in basal ML60 medium may be too low to support growth. After finding and addressing further issues (ionic strength, pH and the use of glass tubes instead of polypropylene) Redfield found that arsenate marginally stimulated growth, but didn't affect the final densities of the cultures, unlike what was claimed. Subsequent studies using mass spectrometry by the same group found no evidence of arsenate being incorporated into the DNA of GFAJ-1.

=== Arsenate ester stability ===
Structure of poly-β-hydroxybutyrate

Arsenate esters, such as those that would be present in DNA, are generally expected to be orders of magnitude less stable to hydrolysis than corresponding phosphate esters. dAMAs, the structural arsenic analog of the DNA building block dAMP, has a half-life of 40 minutes in water at neutral pH. Estimates of the half-life in water of arsenodiester bonds, which would link the nucleotides together, are as short as 0.06 seconds—compared to 30 million years for the phosphodiester bonds in DNA. The authors speculate that the bacteria may stabilize arsenate esters to a degree by using poly-β-hydroxybutyrate (which has been found to be elevated in "vacuole-like regions" of related species of the genus Halomonas ) or other means to lower the effective concentration of water. Polyhydroxybutyrates are used by many bacteria for energy and carbon storage under conditions when growth is limited by elements other than carbon, and typically appear as large waxy granules closely resembling the "vacuole-like regions" seen in GFAJ-1 cells. The authors present no mechanism by which insoluble polyhydroxybutyrate may lower the effective concentration of water in the cytoplasm sufficiently to stabilize arsenate esters. Although all halophiles must reduce the water activity of their cytoplasm by some means to avoid desiccation, the cytoplasm always remains an aqueous environment.

== Criticism of Science study ==
NASA's announcement of a news conference "that will impact the search for evidence of extraterrestrial life" was criticized as sensationalistic and misleading; an editorial in New Scientist commented "although the discovery of alien life, if it ever happens, would be one of the biggest stories imaginable, this was light-years from that".

In addition, many experts who have evaluated the paper have concluded that the reported studies do not provide enough evidence to support the claims made by the authors. In an online article on Slate, science writer Carl Zimmer discussed the skepticism of several scientists: "I reached out to a dozen experts ... Almost unanimously, they think the NASA scientists have failed to make their case". Chemist Steven A. Benner has expressed doubts that arsenate has replaced phosphate in the DNA of this organism. He suggested that the trace contaminants in the growth medium used by Wolfe-Simon in her laboratory cultures are sufficient to supply the phosphorus needed for the cells' DNA. He believes that it is more likely that arsenic is being sequestered elsewhere in the cells. University of British Columbia microbiologist Rosemary Redfield said that the paper "doesn't present any convincing evidence that arsenic has been incorporated into DNA or any other biological molecule", and suggests that the experiments lacked the washing steps and controls necessary to properly validate their conclusions. Harvard microbiologist Alex Bradley said that arsenic-containing DNA would be so unstable in water it could not have survived the analysis procedure.

On 8 December 2010, Science published a response by Wolfe-Simon, in which she stated that criticism of the research was expected. In response, a "Frequently Asked Questions" page to improve understanding of the work was posted on 16 December 2010. The team plans to deposit the GFAJ-1 strain in the ATCC and DSMZ culture collections to allow widespread distribution. The article was published in print six months after acceptance in the 3 June 2011 issue of Science. The publication was accompanied by eight technical comments addressing various concerns regarding the article's experimental procedure and conclusion, as well as a response by the authors to these concerns. The editor in chief Bruce Alberts has indicated that some issues remain and that their resolution is likely to be a long process. A review by Rosen et al., in the March 2011 issue of the journal BioEssays discusses the technical issues with the Science paper, provides alternative explanations, and highlights known biochemistry of other arsenic resistant and arsenic utilizing microbes.

In January 2012 a group of researchers led by Rosie Redfield at the University of British Columbia analyzed the DNA of GFAJ-1 using liquid chromatography–mass spectrometry and could not detect any arsenic, which Redfield calls a "clear refutation" of the original paper's findings. Following the publication of the analysis, Wolfe-Simon stated that she and her colleagues "expect to publish new information in the next few months", but as of 2024 has not submitted any new publications since 2011.

A simple explanation for the GFAJ-1 growth in medium supplied with arsenate instead of phosphate was provided by a team of researchers at the University of Miami in Florida. After labeling the ribosomes of a laboratory strain of Escherichia coli with radioactive isotopes (forming a radioactive tracer), they followed bacterial growth in medium containing arsenate but no phosphate. They found that arsenate induces massive degradation of ribosomes, thus providing sufficient phosphate for the slow growth of arsenate tolerant bacteria. Similarly, they suggest, GFAJ-1 cells grow by recycling phosphate from degraded ribosomes, rather than by replacing it with arsenate.

Following the publication of the articles challenging the conclusions of the original Science article first describing GFAJ-1, the website Retraction Watch argued that the original article should be retracted because of misrepresentation of critical data. The paper was retracted in 2025 with "no evidence of misconduct by researchers". The authors disagreed with the retraction, noting in a response letter published by Science alongside the retraction that they believed that the journal had gone beyond the usual COPE standards, and they expressed concerns that the 2012 studies had not faithfully reproduced the growth conditions of their experiment.

== See also ==
- Arsenic biochemistry
- Arsenate-reducing bacteria
- Arsenic poisoning
- Arsenic toxicity
- Hypothetical types of biochemistry
- Nucleic acid analogues
- Organoarsenic chemistry
- Prebiotic arsenic
