= COMC =

COMC may refer to:

- Canadian Open Mathematics Challenge, competition
- L-2-hydroxycarboxylate dehydrogenase (NAD+), enzyme
- (2R)-3-sulfolactate dehydrogenase (NADP+), enzyme
