= Halomonas stevensii =

Scientific classification
- Domain: Bacteria
- Kingdom: Pseudomonadati
- Phylum: Pseudomonadota
- Class: Gammaproteobacteria
- Order: Oceanospirillales
- Family: Halomonadaceae
- Genus: Halomonas
- Species: H. stevensii

Binomial name
- Halomonas stevensii Stevens et al., 2009

Species of bacterium

Halomonas stevensii is a halophilic bacteria first isolated from dialysis patients and the environment surrounding them. Its genome has been sequenced.
