= Kushneria sinocarnis =

Scientific classification
- Domain: Bacteria
- Kingdom: Pseudomonadati
- Phylum: Pseudomonadota
- Class: Gammaproteobacteria
- Order: Oceanospirillales
- Family: Halomonadaceae
- Genus: Kushneria
- Species: K. sinocarnis

Binomial name
- Kushneria sinocarnis Zou and Wang 2010

Type strain
- Z35

Synonyms
- Kushneria wuhanese

Species of bacterium

Kushneria sinocarnis is a Gram-negative, aerobic and moderately halophilic bacterium from the genus Kushneria which has been isolated from traditional cured meat in Wuhan.
