= Carboxymethylhydantoinase =

Class of enzymes

Identifiers
- EC no.: 3.5.2.4
- CAS no.: 9025-14-3

Databases
- BRENDA: enzyme data
- ExPASy: NiceZyme view
- KEGG: enzyme entry
- MetaCyc: metabolic pathway
- Rhea: reactions
- PDB structures: RCSB PDB PDBe PDBsum
- Gene Ontology: AmiGO / QuickGO
Search
- PMC: articles
- PubMed: articles
- NCBI: proteins

Carboxymethylhydantoinase (EC 3.5.2.4) is an enzyme characterised from the soil bacterium, Zymobacterium oroticum, that catalyzes the hydrolysis of L-5-carboxymethylhydantoin to N-carbamoyl-L-aspartic acid:

L-5-carboxymethylhydantoin
H_{2}O
H_{2}O
N-carbamoyl-L-aspartic acid

The reaction is specific to the L-5-carboxymethylhydantoin enantiomer and hence it can be used in a sequence to manufacture natural L-aspartic acid from the racemic hydantoin.

This enzyme is a hydrolase, one acting on carbon-nitrogen bonds other than peptide bonds, specifically in cyclic amides. The systematic name of this enzyme class is L-5-carboxymethylhydantoin amidohydrolase. This enzyme is also called hydantoin hydrolase.
