= Methylguanidinase =

Class of enzymes

Identifiers
- EC no.: 3.5.3.16
- CAS no.: 73200-93-8

Databases
- BRENDA: enzyme data
- ExPASy: NiceZyme view
- KEGG: enzyme entry
- MetaCyc: metabolic pathway
- Rhea: reactions
- PDB structures: RCSB PDB PDBe PDBsum
- Gene Ontology: AmiGO / QuickGO
Search
- PMC: articles
- PubMed: articles
- NCBI: proteins

Methylguanidinase (EC 3.5.3.16) is an enzyme characterised from Alcaligenes species that catalyzes the hydrolysis of methylguanidine to methylamine and urea:

methylguanidine
H_{2}O
methylamine
+
urea

This enzyme is a hydrolase, one acting on carbon-nitrogen bonds other than peptide bonds, specifically in linear amidines. The systematic name of this enzyme class is methylguanidine amidinohydrolase. This enzyme is also called methylguanidine hydrolase.
