= Halomonas ventosae =

Scientific classification
- Domain: Bacteria
- Kingdom: Pseudomonadati
- Phylum: Pseudomonadota
- Class: Gammaproteobacteria
- Order: Oceanospirillales
- Family: Halomonadaceae
- Genus: Halomonas
- Species: H. ventosae

Binomial name
- Halomonas ventosae Martínez-Cánovas et al. 2004

Species of bacterium

Halomonas ventosae is a moderately halophilic, denitrifying, exopolysaccharide-producing bacterium. Its type strain is Al12^{T} (=CECT 5797^{T} =DSM 15911^{T}). H. ventosae is gram-negative.
