= Cobetia amphilecti =

Scientific classification
- Domain: Bacteria
- Kingdom: Pseudomonadati
- Phylum: Pseudomonadota
- Class: Gammaproteobacteria
- Order: Oceanospirillales
- Family: Halomonadaceae
- Genus: Cobetia
- Species: C. amphilecti

Binomial name
- Cobetia amphilecti Romanenko et al. 2013

Species of bacterium

Cobetia amphilecti is a Gram-negative, aerobic, oxidase-negative, catalase-positive, bacterium. It has non-pigmented, rod-shaped cells, 0.8–0.9 μm in diameter and 1.1–1.3 μm long, motile by means of one polar and/or two or three lateral flagella. Growth is observed in 0–20 % NaCl with an optimum at 5% NaCl, and at 4–42 °C with an optimum at 37 °C. Growth is slow in the absence of NaCl and in the presence of 0.5% NaCl. Grows at pH 4.5–10.5 with an optimum at pH 6.5–8.5. Negative for hydrolysis of gelatin, starch, chitin, aesculin, xanthine, hypoxanthine and Tween 80. Negative for H_{2}S production.

The halotolerant Cobetia amphilecti AMI6 produces glutaminase-free L-asparaginase (CobAsnase) with a molecular mass of 37 kDa on SDS-PAGE. The purified enzyme exhibits optimum activity at pH and temperature of 7.0 and 60 °C, respectively, with obvious thermal stability. It exhibits strict substrate specificity towards L-asparagine with no detectable activity on L-glutamine. Pre-treatment of potato slices by CobAsnase prior to frying reduced the acrylamide contents in the processed chips up to 81% compared with untreated control.
