= Halomonas hamiltonii =

Scientific classification
- Domain: Bacteria
- Kingdom: Pseudomonadati
- Phylum: Pseudomonadota
- Class: Gammaproteobacteria
- Order: Oceanospirillales
- Family: Halomonadaceae
- Genus: Halomonas
- Species: H. hamiltonii

Binomial name
- Halomonas hamiltonii Stevens et al., 2009

Species of bacterium

Halomonas hamiltonii is a halophilic bacteria first isolated from the environment surrounding dialysis patients. It is closely related to H. magadiensis.
