= Ureidosuccinase =

Class of enzymes

Identifiers
- EC no.: 3.5.1.7
- CAS no.: 9024-81-1

Databases
- BRENDA: enzyme data
- ExPASy: NiceZyme view
- KEGG: enzyme entry
- MetaCyc: metabolic pathway
- Rhea: reactions
- PDB structures: RCSB PDB PDBe PDBsum
- Gene Ontology: AmiGO / QuickGO
Search
- PMC: articles
- PubMed: articles
- NCBI: proteins

Ureidosuccinase (EC 3.5.1.7) is an enzyme that catalyzes the chemical reaction

N-carbamoyl-L-aspartic acid
H_{2}O
NH_{3}
aspartic acid
+ CO_{2}

The enzyme characterised from Zymobacterium oroticum hydrolyses N-carbamoyl-L-aspartic acid to aspartic acid, with ammonia and carbon dioxide as byproducts. The reaction is part of the breakdown of orotic acid.

This enzyme is a hydrolase, one acting on carbon-nitrogen bonds other than peptide bonds, specifically in linear amides. The systematic name of this enzyme class is N-carbamoyl-L-aspartate amidohydrolase.
