= Chromohalobacter marismortui =

Scientific classification
- Domain: Bacteria
- Kingdom: Pseudomonadati
- Phylum: Pseudomonadota
- Class: Gammaproteobacteria
- Order: Oceanospirillales
- Family: Halomonadaceae
- Genus: Chromohalobacter
- Species: C. marismortui

Binomial name
- Chromohalobacter marismortui Ventosa and others, 1989

Species of bacterium

Chromohalobacter marismortui is a gram negative, oxidase and catalase positive, rod shaped, motile marine bacterium. It is commonly found in marine environments and was isolated from marine sponges of the Saint Martin's Island area of the Bay of Bengal, Bangladesh. Colonies are medium-sized, round and yellowish in color. Type strain of C. marismortui is M.G.1.1T (=ATCC 17056 =IAM 14437 =CCM 3518 =DSM 6770).
