= Kushneria aurantia =

Scientific classification
- Domain: Bacteria
- Kingdom: Pseudomonadati
- Phylum: Pseudomonadota
- Class: Gammaproteobacteria
- Order: Oceanospirillales
- Family: Halomonadaceae
- Genus: Kushneria
- Species: K. aurantia

Binomial name
- Kushneria aurantia Sánchez-Porro et al. 2009

Type strain
- A10

Species of bacterium

Kushneria aurantia is a Gram-negative, aerobic, non-spore-forming, rod-shaped and moderately halophilic bacterium from the genus Kushneria which has been isolated from the surface of leaves from the mangrove Avicennia germinans.
