= C. marina =

C. marina may refer to:

- Caloplaca marina, the orange sea lichen, a crustose placodioid lichen species
- Citreitalea marina, a Gram-negative and strictly aerobic bacterium from the genus of Citreitalea
- Cobetia marina, a Gram-negative marine bacterium species

== See also ==
- Marina (disambiguation)
