= Kushneria marisflavi =

Scientific classification
- Domain: Bacteria
- Kingdom: Pseudomonadati
- Phylum: Pseudomonadota
- Class: Gammaproteobacteria
- Order: Oceanospirillales
- Family: Halomonadaceae
- Genus: Kushneria
- Species: K. marisflavi

Binomial name
- Kushneria marisflavi (Yoon et al. 2001) Sánchez-Porro et al. 2009

Type strain
- SW32

Synonyms
- Halomonas marisflava Halomonas marisflavae Halomonas marisflavi

Species of bacterium

Kushneria marisflavi is a Gram-negative and halophilic bacterium from the genus Kushneria which has been isolated from the Yellow Sea in Korea.
