= Halomonas johnsoniae =

Scientific classification
- Domain: Bacteria
- Kingdom: Pseudomonadati
- Phylum: Pseudomonadota
- Class: Gammaproteobacteria
- Order: Oceanospirillales
- Family: Halomonadaceae
- Genus: Halomonas
- Species: H. johnsoniae

Binomial name
- Halomonas johnsoniae Stevens et al., 2009

Species of bacterium

Halomonas johnsoniae is a halophilic bacteria first isolated from the environment surrounding dialysis patients. It is closely related to H. magadiensis.
