= Kushneria endophytica =

Scientific classification
- Domain: Bacteria
- Kingdom: Pseudomonadati
- Phylum: Pseudomonadota
- Class: Gammaproteobacteria
- Order: Oceanospirillales
- Family: Halomonadaceae
- Genus: Kushneria
- Species: K. endophytica

Binomial name
- Kushneria endophytica Navarro-Torre et al. 2018

Species of bacterium

Kushneria endophytica is an endophytic and plant growth promoting bacterium from the genus Kushneria which has been isolated from the plant Arthrocnemum macrostachyum from the Odiel marshes in Spain.
