= Halomonas anticariensis =

Scientific classification
- Domain: Bacteria
- Kingdom: Pseudomonadati
- Phylum: Pseudomonadota
- Class: Gammaproteobacteria
- Order: Oceanospirillales
- Family: Halomonadaceae
- Genus: Halomonas
- Species: H. anticariensis

Binomial name
- Halomonas anticariensis Martínez-Cánovas et al. 2004

Species of bacterium

Halomonas anticariensis is a bacterium. It is strictly aerobic and because of its production of exopolysaccharides forms cream-coloured, mucoid colonies. FP35^{T} (=LMG 22089^{T} =CECT 5854^{T}) is the type strain. Its genome has been sequenced.
