= Halovibrio salipaludis =

Scientific classification
- Domain: Bacteria
- Kingdom: Pseudomonadati
- Phylum: Pseudomonadota
- Class: Gammaproteobacteria
- Order: Oceanospirillales
- Family: Halomonadaceae
- Genus: Halovibrio
- Species: H. salipaludis

Binomial name
- Halovibrio salipaludis Tang et al. 2021

Type strain
- YL5-2

Species of bacterium

Halovibrio salipaludis is a Gram-negative, aerobic, halophilic and motile bacterium from the genus Halovibrio which has been isolated from saline-alkaline wetland soil from Binhai.
