= Kushneria pakistanensis =

Scientific classification
- Domain: Bacteria
- Kingdom: Pseudomonadati
- Phylum: Pseudomonadota
- Class: Gammaproteobacteria
- Order: Oceanospirillales
- Family: Halomonadaceae
- Genus: Kushneria
- Species: K. pakistanensis

Binomial name
- Kushneria pakistanensis Bangash et al. 2015

Type strain
- NCCP-934

Species of bacterium

Kushneria pakistanensis is a Gram-negative, moderately halophilic, rod-shaped and motile bacterium from the genus Kushneria which has been isolated from the rhizosphere of the grass Saccharum spontaneum from the Karak district in Pakistan.
