= Kushneria avicenniae =

Scientific classification
- Domain: Bacteria
- Kingdom: Pseudomonadati
- Phylum: Pseudomonadota
- Class: Gammaproteobacteria
- Order: Oceanospirillales
- Family: Halomonadaceae
- Genus: Kushneria
- Species: K. avicenniae

Binomial name
- Kushneria avicenniae (Soto-Ramírez et al. 2007) Sánchez-Porro et al. 2009

Type strain
- MW2a

Synonyms
- Halomonas avicenniae Halomonas mangle

Species of bacterium

Kushneria avicenniae is a Gram-negative and moderately halophilic bacterium from the genus Kushneria which has been isolated from surface of leaves from the mangrove Avicennia germinans.
