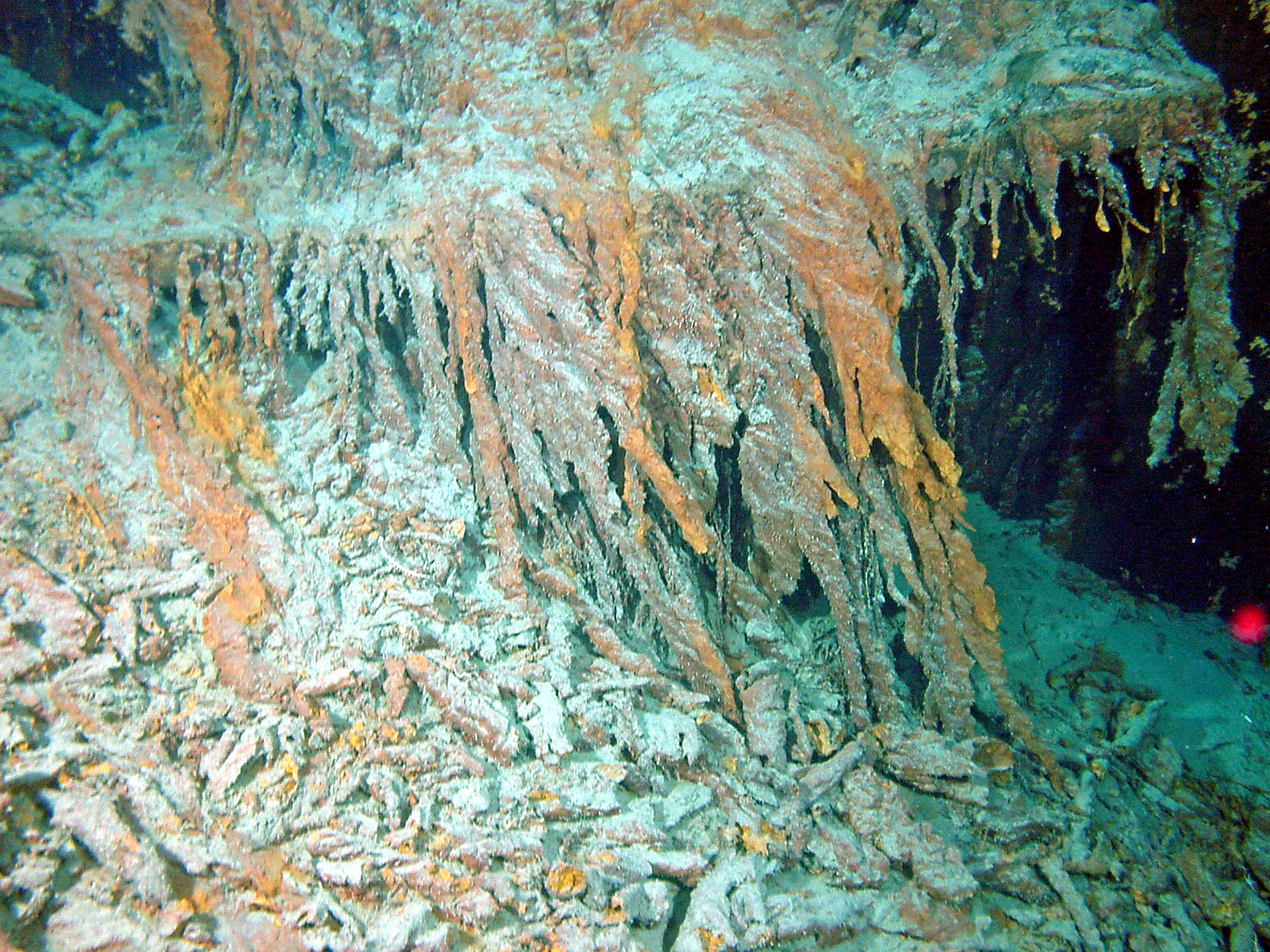

Scientific classification
- Domain: Bacteria
- Kingdom: Pseudomonadati
- Phylum: Pseudomonadota
- Class: Gammaproteobacteria
- Order: Oceanospirillales
- Family: Halomonadaceae
- Genus: Halomonas
- Species: H. titanicae

Binomial name
- Halomonas titanicae Mann, Kaur, Sánchez-Porro & Ventosa 2010

= Halomonas titanicae =

Species of bacterium

Halomonas titanicae is a gram-negative, halophilic species of bacteria which was isolated in 2010 from rusticles recovered from the wreck of the RMS Titanic. It has been estimated by Henrietta Mann, one of the researchers who first isolated it, that the action of microbes like H. titanicae may bring about the total deterioration of the Titanic by 2030. While the bacteria have been identified as a potential danger to oil rigs and other man-made objects in the deep sea, they also have the potential to be used in bioremediation to accelerate the decomposition of shipwrecks on the ocean floor.

== Cell morphology ==
Halomonas titanicae is a gram-negative, rod-shaped bacterium that produces peritrichous flagella. It is catalase and oxidase positive. It has been found to form biofilms and some strains are capable of oxidation of thiosulfate, which is regulated by quorum sensing. It is able to withstand high osmotic pressure due to producing molecules like ectoine, hydroxyectoine, betaine, and glycine.

== Importance in corrosion ==
H. titanicae is involved in the corrosion of steel by reducing Fe(III) to Fe(II) when oxygen is not available as an electron acceptor. However, when in aerobic conditions, it helps to inhibit corrosion by consuming dissolved oxygen. In the case of the Titanic and other shipwrecks, the bacteria accelerate the corrosion of these structures since levels of dissolved oxygen deep in the ocean are very low.

H. titanicae strain BH1T is a type of bacteria that falls within the larger category of Bacteria, specifically in the phylum Proteobacteria and the class Gammaproteobacteria. In the classification scheme, it falls under the category of Oceanospirillales, specifically within the family Halomonadaceae and the genus Halomonas. Scientists discovered this bacterium in rusticles collected from the wreckage of the RMS Titanic. They compared its genetic material to other bacteria and found it is closely related (98.6%) to another bacterium called Halomonas neptunia in regard to a 16S rRNA gene sequence comparison. The family comprises diverse halophilic bacteria found in marine environments. Bacteria of the genus Halomonas, including H. titanicae, prefer salty habitats and generally don't pose a threat to other organisms.

== Scientific research and biotechnological potential ==
Recent studies have expanded the understanding of Halomonas titanicae beyond its role in metal corrosion. This bacterium is capable of surviving extreme conditions in deep-sea environments due to its halophilic nature and the production of osmoprotectants such as ectoine, hydroxyectoine, and glycine betaine.

These properties make it a model organism for studying life in high-pressure, high-salinity environments, contributing to extremophile research. Moreover, H. titanicae has shown potential for use in environmentally beneficial applications. Its ability to form biofilms and reduce metal ions is being explored for bioremediation, particularly in the detoxification and breakdown of industrial waste, including heavy metals and sulfates.

The organism's iron-reducing capabilities are of particular interest in the context of cleaning up polluted aquatic environments or supporting the controlled breakdown of marine debris such as decommissioned ships and oil rigs. Researchers have also discovered that H. titanicae exhibits quorum sensing-based regulation of thiosulfate oxidation, pointing to possible manipulation of its behavior in synthetic biology applications.

As exploration of the deep sea expands, extremophiles like H. titanicae may be harnessed for sustainable technologies in marine conservation, bioenergy, and waste treatment.

== Discovery process/methods ==
The discovery of the bacterium Halomonas titanicae results from the study of the RMS Titanic wreckage and how microbial degradation influences the shape of the sunken ship. The bacterium was found by a research team, which was led by Dr. Henrietta Mann and included scientists from Dalhousie University, in Halifax, Canada, and the University of Seville, in Spain, and international partners. They were interested to know what caused the deterioration of the Titanic which sank in the North Atlantic in 1912. It was discovered through the examination of rusticles, which are icicle-like structures as seen on the Titanic's wreck. Rusticles are the result of the work of bacteria that ingest light metals such as iron on the ship, leaving the rust as the waste product. The crew gathered these rusticles during a diving expedition to the wreckage. There were more samples gathered from multiple expeditions to the Titanic site after the initial discovery. After some microbiological and genetic analysis, they were able to isolate a new species of bacterium.

To isolate the strain, a sample was repeatedly streaked onto Bacto marine agar 2216 medium (Difco). This method aimed to obtain a pure culture by separating individual bacterial colonies. The choice of marine agar suggests a preference for halophilic or halotolerant bacteria, as marine agar typically contains high salt levels suitable for their growth. The use of marine agar implies that it acted as a selective medium for halophilic bacteria as it is known for its high salt content, mimicking the saline conditions of marine environments. Therefore, the isolation process likely favored the growth of halophilic bacteria present in the rusticle samples. The bacterium was officially identified and named in a study published in 2010 by Sánchez-Porro.

== Insight characterization ==
H. titanicae, known as a Gram-negative bacterium that obtains nutrients from organic sources, and thrives in environments with plenty of oxygen. It thus exhibits heterotrophic behaviors in these aerobic conditions. It shows moderate tolerance to salt, growing best in solutions containing between 0.5% and 25% NaCl (5-250 g/L), with ideal development occurring at NaCl levels between 2% and 8% (20-80 g/L) (the ocean's salinity averages 3.5%). Additional research by Li, indicates that this bacterium grows best at temperatures between 30 °C and 37 °C and prefers a slightly alkaline pH ranging from 7.0 to 7.5. It primarily obtains energy from organic compounds and can utilize various carbon sources like acetate, glucose, glycerol, and lactose. Additionally, it undergoes respiratory metabolism and produces enzymes such as catalase and oxidase.

The H. titanicae BH1 genome displays genes related to metal corrosion. Additionally, numerous metallopeptidases are present. Nitrate reductases, indicative of the ability to perform anaerobic respiration, are also detected.

H. titanicae was originated from rusticle samples sourced from the Titanic site. Rusticles are bioconcretious structures formed by a consortium of microorganisms. The bacterium is associated with saline-rich habitats as well as deep-sea environments. It plays a role in the decomposition of organic matter and nutrient cycling processes in extreme environments. It contributes to the microbial community dynamics of the deep-sea environment.

== Sulfur oxidation ==
H. titanicae demonstrates a proficient competence in thiosulfate utilization, thus influencing the sulfur cycle in these harsh habitats. A closer examination of its genetic makeup, it becomes evident that this bacterium houses specific genes responsible for thiosulfate oxidation, notably enzymes named TsdA and TsdB. These enzymes play pivotal roles in the oxidation process to form tetrathionate, providing an alternative energy source derived from compounds with sulfur. Such genetic assets hint at a strategic adaptation for H. titanicae, allowing it to flourish amidst the dynamic chemical milieu of hydrothermal vents. Furthermore, signs of possible communication networks among microorganisms within the genome hint at a sophisticated regulatory framework governing the breakdown of thiosulfate. Overall, the sulfur oxidation prowess exhibited by H. titanicae underscores its importance in contributing to the sulfur biogeochemistry of deep-sea hydrothermal ecosystems, accentuating its ecological relevance in harsh conditions.

== Corrosion and habitat adaptation ==
This microorganism's resilience in extreme marine environments captivates researchers, particularly its involvement in the degradation of submerged metal structures. The capability of H. titanicae at adapting to its surroundings involves interactions with environmental factors, notably acceptors of electrons such as oxygen and iron. In environments rich in oxygen, H. titanicae employs a metabolic approach that curtails corrosion by modulating the concentration of oxygen in solution, thereby hindering the corrosive processes. Conversely, in settings without oxygen, this bacterium accelerates corrosion by instigating chemical reactions that disrupt the protective layers on metal surfaces. H. titanicae adjusted its metabolic processes, utilizing solid Fe(III) as an electron acceptor, which led to its accumulation on the surface of EH40 steel. This metabolic shift triggered the reduction of Fe(III), gradually causing the surface film to degrade over time and expose fresh areas, thereby expediting the corrosion process. Furthermore, the development of a microbial film increased the impediment to disodium citrate diffusion, potentially leading to carbon depletion among bacteria in close proximity to the surface. As a result, this metabolic adaptation facilitated localized corrosion by encouraging the utilization of H_{2} as an electron donor within the microenvironment. The corrosion mechanisms observed in H. titanicae underscore the complex interplay between microbial activity and metal degradation in marine ecosystems. Gaining insights into the nuances of its corrosion dynamics is pivotal for devising effective strategies to manage and mitigate corrosion damage in underwater structures, including historically significant artifacts such as the Titanic.

== Genomics ==
The genomic analysis of H. titanicae provides profound insights into the bacterium's adaptation mechanisms and its survival in extreme environments. The fully sequenced genomes of strains SOB56 and BH1, each featuring a circular chromosome with a G+C content of approximately 54.6% and over 4,700 coding sequences, include genes critical for thriving in saline and metal-rich habitats. These genomic features highlight the bacterium's capability to handle osmotic stress and metal toxicity, crucial for its existence in high-salt environments.

Further examination reveals the phylogenomic uniqueness of H. titanicae. This uniqueness refers to the distinct evolutionary traits and genetic adaptations that set this bacterium apart from its closest phylogenetic relatives. For example, unique gene clusters associated with osmoregulation and metal resistance, and specialized pathways for utilizing complex substrates under saline conditions are evident. These genomic insights are not just markers of robust adaptation but also underscore the evolutionary innovations that enable H. titanicae to exploit niche habitats characterized by extreme abiotic stressors.

The phylogenomic analysis provides information on the evolutionary pathways associated with the specialized adaptations observed in H. titanicae, placing these adaptations within a broader evolutionary context in the Halomonas genus. By mapping these genetic signatures, researchers gain perspectives on the mechanisms of microbial survival and adaptation in harsh environments, which may have applications in biotechnology and environmental management. Such genomic and phylogenomic investigations have been used to further our understanding of extremophiles and leverage their capacities for industrial and environmental applications.

== Probiotic potential and immunity ==
Exploring the potential of H. titanicae as a beneficial agent in aquaculture has emerged from its distinct environmental adaptability and metabolic capabilities. Given its preference for salty environments and ability to withstand various stressors, H. titanicae presents a promising candidate for probiotic use in aquaculture. Its robustness in handling osmotic stress and its diverse metabolic pathways for utilizing organic compounds suggest potential benefits for modulating gut microbiota and enhancing the resilience and health of aquatic species. Researchers have focused on the immune tissues in the gut, aiming to boost the resilience of aquatic species against harmful pathogens and promote overall well-being.

Further investigation reveals promising outcomes, such as the study demonstrating that incorporating H. titanicae HT-Tc3 into the diet of turbot significantly enhances growth rates, gut enzyme activity, and immune function. Noteworthy changes in gut microbiome composition, including increased levels of beneficial commensal bacteria, were observed upon the introduction of H. titanicae. It also demonstrated enhanced resistance to illness and established a prolonged presence in the gut, maintaining its probiotic benefits even after discontinuation of use. This highlights its potential as a valuable asset in aquaculture operations.

These findings contribute to the understanding of the intricate interplay between gut microbiota, immunity, and host health in aquatic species. The ongoing research underscores the importance of exploring the complex mechanisms associated with probiotics derived from H. titanicae, essential for optimizing their use in aquaculture and ultimately contributing to improved disease management and sustainable aquaculture practices.
