= Halovibrio denitrificans =

Scientific classification
- Domain: Bacteria
- Kingdom: Pseudomonadati
- Phylum: Pseudomonadota
- Class: Gammaproteobacteria
- Order: Oceanospirillales
- Family: Halomonadaceae
- Genus: Halovibrio
- Species: H. denitrificans

Binomial name
- Halovibrio denitrificans Sorokin et al. 2006

Species of bacterium

Halovibrio denitrificans is an extremely halophilic and denitrifying bacterium from the genus Halovibrio which has been isolated from sediments from a hypersaline lake from Central Asia.
