= Halomonas aquamarina =

Scientific classification
- Domain: Bacteria
- Kingdom: Pseudomonadati
- Phylum: Pseudomonadota
- Class: Gammaproteobacteria
- Order: Oceanospirillales
- Family: Halomonadaceae
- Genus: Halomonas
- Species: H. aquamarina

Binomial name
- Halomonas aquamarina (ZoBell and Upham 1944) Dobson and Franzmann 1996

Type strain
- ATCC 27128, Baumann 134, CECT 4265, CGMCC 1.2311, CIP 74.08, CIP 74.8, DSM 4739, DSMZ 4739, IAM 12551, JCM 20631, LMG 3449, NCIMB 1980, NCMB 1980]

Synonyms
- "Achromobacter aquamarinus" ZoBell and Upham 1944; Alcaligenes aestus Baumann et al. 1972; Alcaligenes aquamarinus (ZoBell and Upham 1944) Hendrie et al. 1974); Deleya aesta (Baumann et al. 1972) Baumann et al. 1983; Deleya aquamarina (ZoBell and Upham 1944) Akagawa and Yamasato 1989

Species of bacterium

Halomonas aquamarina is a bacterium from the genus Halomonas. It was previously classified in the genera Alcaligenes and later Deleya.
