= Halomonas desiderata =

Scientific classification
- Domain: Bacteria
- Kingdom: Pseudomonadati
- Phylum: Pseudomonadota
- Class: Gammaproteobacteria
- Order: Oceanospirillales
- Family: Halomonadaceae
- Genus: Halomonas
- Species: H. desiderata

Binomial name
- Halomonas desiderata Berendes et al. 1997

Species of bacterium

Halomonas desiderata is an alkaliphilic, halotolerant and denitrifying bacterium first isolated from a municipal sewage works.
