= Ariel Anbar =

Isotope geochemist

Ariel D. Anbar
- Education: Harvard University AB 1989, California Institute of Technology PhD 1996
- Awards: Donath Medal (2002); Arthur L. Day Medal (2020)
- Scientific career
- Institutions: Arizona State University
- Doctoral advisor: Gerald J. Wasserburg
- Website: https://www.anbarlab.org/

Ariel Anbar is an isotope geochemist and President's Professor at Arizona State University. He has published over 180 refereed papers on topics ranging from the origins of Earth's atmosphere to detecting life on other worlds to diagnosing human disease.

== Education and career ==
Anbar was born in Rehovot, Israel and raised in Palo Alto, California and Amherst, New York. He received a A.B. in Geological Sciences and Chemistry from Harvard University in 1989. While at Harvard, he worked under the supervision of Heinrich Holland and conducted experiments that suggested the importance of photochemical oxidation in Archean oceans, especially as a possible source of manganese oxides before the Great Oxidation Event. Since 2004, he has been on the faculty in the School of Earth and Space Exploration and the School of Molecular Sciences at Arizona State University. Anbar was a co-author with Felisa Wolfe-Simon on the 2011 Science article "A Bacterium That Can Grow by Using Arsenic Instead of Phosphorus". Reports refuting the most significant aspects of the original results were published in the same journal in 2012. Following the publication of the articles challenging the conclusions of the original Science article first describing GFAJ-1, David Sanders on the website Retraction Watch argued that the original article should be retracted because of misrepresentation of critical data. The article has been retracted, although Anbar argued that it should not have been.

== Research ==
His group was the first to report natural fractionation of molybdenum isotopes, including how and why molybdenum isotopes fractionate during adsorption to manganese oxides. This work provided a foundation for the use of molybdenum isotopes to study ancient ocean redox change. Anbar and colleagues discovered a "whiff of oxygen" fifty million years before the Great Oxidation Event.

Anbar's group has also worked on iron isotopes, demonstrating abiotic fractionation in low and high temperature systems. They have also worked to develop the uranium isotope system as a paleoredox proxy, opening up the carbonate sedimentary record for investigation of changes in ocean oxygenation and their linkages to evolution.

Anbar has also been involved in development of method to use calcium isotopes to study bone disease.

== Leadership ==
Anbar led the NASA Astrobiology Institute program at Arizona State University from 2009 to 2015. He served as President-Elect and President of the Biogeosciences Section of the American Geophysical Union from 2015 to 2019.

== Awards ==
Anbar is a Fellow of the Geological Society of America, the Geochemical Society, the European Association of Geochemistry, and the American Geophysical Union. In 2002, he was awarded the Young Scientist Award (Donath Medal) from the Geological Society of America. In 2014, he was appointed a Howard Hughes Medical Institute Professor in recognition of his work in digital learning innovation. In 2017, he was named one of 10 “teaching innovators” by the Chronicle of Higher Education. He was the Endowed Biogeochemistry Lecturer at the Goldschmidt Geochemistry Conference in 2017, and received the Samuel Epstein Science Innovation Award from the European Association of Geochemistry in 2019. He received the Arthur L. Day Medal from the Geological Society of America in 2020. He is a Distinguished Sustainability Scholar in the Julie Ann Wrigley Global Institute of Sustainability at Arizona State University.
