= Kushneria konosiri =

Scientific classification
- Domain: Bacteria
- Kingdom: Pseudomonadati
- Phylum: Pseudomonadota
- Class: Gammaproteobacteria
- Order: Oceanospirillales
- Family: Halomonadaceae
- Genus: Kushneria
- Species: K. konosiri

Binomial name
- Kushneria konosiri Yun et al. 2017

Type strain
- X49

Species of bacterium

Kushneria konosiri is a Gram-negative, obligately aerobic and motile bacterium from the genus Kushneria which has been isolated from the seafood Daemi-jeot.
