= (S)-sulfolactate dehydrogenase =

Class of enzymes

Identifiers
- EC no.: 1.1.1.310

Databases
- IntEnz: IntEnz view
- BRENDA: BRENDA entry
- ExPASy: NiceZyme view
- KEGG: KEGG entry
- MetaCyc: metabolic pathway
- PRIAM: profile
- PDB structures: RCSB PDB PDBe PDBsum
Search
- PMC: articles
- PubMed: articles
- NCBI: proteins

(S)-sulfolactate dehydrogenase (EC 1.1.1.310, (2S)-3-sulfolactate dehydrogenase, SlcC) is an enzyme with systematic name (2S)-sulfolactate:NAD^{+} oxidoreductase. This enzyme catalyses the following chemical reaction:

(S)-3-sulfolactic acid
+ NAD^{+}
H^{+}
H^{+}
sulfopyruvate
+ NADH

This bacterial (Chromohalobacter salexigens) enzyme acts on the 3-sulfolactate.

== See also ==
- (2R)-3-sulfolactate dehydrogenase (NADP+) which catalyses the same reaction using the enantiomer of the starting material
