= Halomonas halophila =

Scientific classification
- Domain: Bacteria
- Kingdom: Pseudomonadati
- Phylum: Pseudomonadota
- Class: Gammaproteobacteria
- Order: Oceanospirillales
- Family: Halomonadaceae
- Genus: Halomonas
- Species: H. halophila

Binomial name
- Halomonas halophila (Quesada et al. 1984) Dobson and Franzmann 1996

Synonyms
- Deleya halophila Quesada et al. 1984; Deleya salina Valderrama et al. 1991; Halomonas salina (Valderrama et al. 1991) Dobson and Franzmann 1996

Species of bacterium

Halomonas halophila (also known as Deleya halophila) is a salt-loving, gram-negative bacteria. It is known to habitat marine environments, solar salterns, saline soils, and salted food. The genus was named after J. De Ley, a noted biologist. Its type strain is CCM 3662.

This particular species is anaerobic, rod-shaped and motile, thanks to possessing eight petritichous flagella. It grows optimally in 7.5% (wt/vol) sodium chloride solution. Albeit, salt shock is achieved with a concentration of 2-2.5M, affecting cell division and protein synthesis. Its reaction to heat shock is also associated with the medium's salt concentration.

This species is also a good exponent of biomineralisation, particularly precipitation of calcium carbonate.
