= Kushneria indalinina =

Scientific classification
- Domain: Bacteria
- Kingdom: Pseudomonadati
- Phylum: Pseudomonadota
- Class: Gammaproteobacteria
- Order: Oceanospirillales
- Family: Halomonadaceae
- Genus: Kushneria
- Species: K. indalinina

Binomial name
- Kushneria indalinina (Cabrera et al. 2007) Sánchez-Porro et al. 2009

Type strain
- CG2.1

Synonyms
- Halomonas indalinina Salinomonas halophila

Species of bacterium

Kushneria indalinina is a moderately halophilic, Gram-negative, aerobic and motile bacterium from the genus Kushneria which has been isolated from a solar saltern from Cabo de Gata.
