= Gram-negative toe web infection =

- Specialty: Dermatology

Gram-negative toe web infection is a skin condition that often begins with dermatophytosis.

Gram-negative toe web infection is a relatively common infection. It is commonly found on people who are engaged in athletic activities while wearing closed-toe or tight fitting shoes. It grows in a moist environment. Gram-negative is mixed bacterial infection with the following organisms:

- Moraxella
- Alcaligenes
- Acinetobacter
- Pseudomonas
- Proteus
- Erwinia

This mixing of infection and organisms may also cause a mild secondary infection of athlete's foot.

== See also ==
- Skin lesion
