= Alcaligenes piechaudii =

Scientific classification
- Domain: Bacteria
- Kingdom: Pseudomonadati
- Phylum: Pseudomonadota
- Class: Betaproteobacteria
- Order: Burkholderiales
- Family: Alcaligenaceae
- Genus: Alcaligenes
- Species: A. piechaudii

Binomial name
- Alcaligenes piechaudii Kiredjian et al., 1986

Species of bacterium

Alcaligenes piechaudii is a bacterium; its type strain is CIP 60.75 (= Hugh 366-5 = IAM 12591 = LMG 1873). It is rod-shaped, aerobic, Gram negative, unpigmented, and motile by peritrichous flagella. It is found in humans and in the environment.
