= Kushneria phosphatilytica =

Scientific classification
- Domain: Bacteria
- Kingdom: Pseudomonadati
- Phylum: Pseudomonadota
- Class: Gammaproteobacteria
- Order: Oceanospirillales
- Family: Halomonadaceae
- Genus: Kushneria
- Species: K. phosphatilytica

Binomial name
- Kushneria phosphatilytica Du et al. 2020

Type strain
- YCWA18

Species of bacterium

Kushneria phosphatilytica is a Gram-negative, phosphate-solubilizing, aerobic, rod-shaped, non-endospore-forming, halophilic and motile bacterium from the genus Kushneria which has been isolated from sediments from the Jimo-Daqiao saltern in China.
