= Chromohalobacter canadensis =

Scientific classification
- Domain: Bacteria
- Kingdom: Pseudomonadati
- Phylum: Pseudomonadota
- Class: Gammaproteobacteria
- Order: Oceanospirillales
- Family: Halomonadaceae
- Genus: Chromohalobacter
- Species: C. canadensis

Binomial name
- Chromohalobacter canadensis (Huval et al. 1996) Arahal et al. 2001

Type strain
- NRCC 41227 = ATCC 43984

Synonyms
- Halomonas canadensis

Species of bacterium

Chromohalobacter canadensis is a halotolerant bacterium from the genus of Chromohalobacter.
