= Chromohalobacter beijerinckii =

Scientific classification
- Domain: Bacteria
- Kingdom: Pseudomonadati
- Phylum: Pseudomonadota
- Class: Gammaproteobacteria
- Order: Oceanospirillales
- Family: Halomonadaceae
- Genus: Chromohalobacter
- Species: C. beijerinckii

Binomial name
- Chromohalobacter beijerinckii (Hof 1935); Peçonek et al. 2006

Synonyms
- Pseudomonas beijerinckii Hof 1935

Species of bacterium

Chromohalobacter beijerinckii is a motile, rod-like, salt-loving, Gram-negative soil bacterium, 0.4–0.6 μm by 1.8–2.5 μm.

The bacterium was isolated in 1935 by T. Hof from fermented salted beans preserved in brine. Hof named it Pseudomonas beijerinckii and identified it as the organism responsible for the purple color of that food. The pigment was the calcium salt of tetrahydroxy-p-benzoquinone Ca_{2}C_{6}O_{6}, derived from the beans' myo-inositol. The bacterium thrives in media with salt (NaCl) concentrations ranging from 0.35% to 25%; the optimum growth occurs at 8 to 10% NaCl, pH 7.5, and 35 °C.

== Reclassification ==
In 2006, comparison of the DNAs of P. beijerinckii's DNA with that of other Chromohalobacter bacteria indicated that it definitely belonged to that genus, and in fact was virtually identical to a species of Chromohalobacter recently isolated from salted herring of the Baltic Sea. Therefore the name was changed to Chromohalobacter beijerinckii. It is very similar but distinct from the species Chromohalobacter japonicus, isolated in 2007 from a Japanese salty food.
