= Halomonas subglaciescola =

Scientific classification
- Domain: Bacteria
- Kingdom: Pseudomonadati
- Phylum: Pseudomonadota
- Class: Gammaproteobacteria
- Order: Oceanospirillales
- Family: Halomonadaceae
- Genus: Halomonas
- Species: H. subglaciescola

Binomial name
- Halomonas subglaciescola Franzmann, Burton & Mcmeekin, 1987

Species of bacterium

Halomonas subglaciescola is a Gram-negative halophilic bacterium. It was first isolated from an Antarctic, hypersaline, meromictic lake, but has since been found in other environments, such as fermenting seafood. It has a largely oxidative mode of metabolism and it is motile through peritrichous flagellation. This species doesn't utilise glucose, and its type strain is ACAM 12 (= UQM 2926).
