= Halomonas alimentaria =

Scientific classification
- Domain: Bacteria
- Kingdom: Pseudomonadati
- Phylum: Pseudomonadota
- Class: Gammaproteobacteria
- Order: Oceanospirillales
- Family: Halomonadaceae
- Genus: Halomonas
- Species: H. alimentaria

Binomial name
- Halomonas alimentaria Yoon et al. 2002

Species of bacterium

Halomonas alimentaria is a bacterium first isolated from jeotgal, a traditional Korean fermented seafood, hence its name. It is Gram-negative, moderately halophilic, non-motile and coccus- or short rod-shaped, with type strain YKJ-16^{T} (= KCCM 41042^{T} = JCM 10888^{T}).
