= Cobetia crustatorum =

Scientific classification
- Domain: Bacteria
- Kingdom: Pseudomonadati
- Phylum: Pseudomonadota
- Class: Gammaproteobacteria
- Order: Oceanospirillales
- Family: Halomonadaceae
- Genus: Cobetia
- Species: C. crustatorum

Binomial name
- Cobetia crustatorum Kim et al. 2010

Type strain
- JO1

Species of bacterium

Cobetia crustatorum is a Gram-negative, slightly halophilic, aerobic and straight-rod-shaped bacterium from the genus of Cobetia which has been isolated from jeotgal.
