= Halomonas alkaliphila =

Scientific classification
- Domain: Bacteria
- Kingdom: Pseudomonadati
- Phylum: Pseudomonadota
- Class: Gammaproteobacteria
- Order: Oceanospirillales
- Family: Halomonadaceae
- Genus: Halomonas
- Species: H. alkaliphila

Binomial name
- Halomonas alkaliphila Romano et al. 2007

Species of bacterium

Halomonas alkaliphila is a Gram-negative halophilic Pseudomonadota. Its specific epithet stems from the Arabic word alkali (al-qaliy), the ashes of saltwort and the Latin adjective philus -a -um, meaning "friend" or "loving": loving alkaline media. The species was first isolated from a salt pool in Campania, Italy.
