= (2R)-3-sulfolactate dehydrogenase (NADP+) =

Class of enzymes

(2R)-3-sulfolactate dehydrogenase (NADP^{+})

Identifiers
- EC no.: 1.1.1.338
- CAS no.: 81210-65-3

Databases
- IntEnz: IntEnz view
- BRENDA: BRENDA entry
- ExPASy: NiceZyme view
- KEGG: KEGG entry
- MetaCyc: metabolic pathway
- PRIAM: profile
- PDB structures: RCSB PDB PDBe PDBsum
Search
- PMC: articles
- PubMed: articles
- NCBI: proteins

(2R)-3-sulfolactate dehydrogenase (NADP^{+}) (EC 1.1.1.338, (R)-sulfolactate:NADP^{+} oxidoreductase, L-sulfolactate dehydrogenase, (R)-sulfolactate dehydrogenase, ComC) is an enzyme with systematic name (2R)-3-sulfolactate:NADP^{+} oxidoreductase. It catalyses the following chemical reaction:

(R)-3-sulfolactic acid
+ NADP^{+}
H^{+}
H^{+}
sulfopyruvate
+ NADPH

The enzyme from the bacterium Chromohalobacter salexigens can only utilize NADP^{+}.

== See also ==
- (S)-sulfolactate dehydrogenase which catalyses the same reaction using the enantiomer of the starting material
