= Chromohalobacter =

Scientific classification
- Domain: Bacteria
- Kingdom: Pseudomonadati
- Phylum: Pseudomonadota
- Class: Gammaproteobacteria
- Order: Oceanospirillales
- Family: Halomonadaceae
- Genus: Chromohalobacter; Ventosa et al. 1989

Species
- See text.

Genus of bacteria

Chromohalobacter is a gram negative, oxidase and catalase positive, rod shaped, motile marine Pseudomonadota. It is commonly found in marine environments. Two species of Chromohalobacter (Chromohalobacter marismortui and Chromohalobacter salexigens) was isolated from marine sponges of the Saint Martin's Island area of the Bay of Bengal, Bangladesh. Colonies are medium-sized, round and yellowish. It was established by Ventosa and others in 1989, with the reclassification of Chromobacterium marismortui as Chromohalobacter marismortui. As of 2007, it comprised the following species:

- C. beijerinckii, formerly Pseudomonas beijerinckii (T. Hof, 1935; Peçonek and others, 2006)
- C. canadensis (Arahal and others, 2001).
- C. israelensis (Arahal and others, 2001).
- C. japonicus (Sanches-Porro and others, 2007)
- C. marismortui (Ventosa and others, 1989).
- C. nigrandesensis (Prado and others, 2006).
- C. salarius (Agulilera and others, 2007).
- C. salexigens (Arahal and others, 2001).
- C. saracensis (Quillaguamán and others, 2004).
