= Halomonas venusta =

Scientific classification
- Domain: Bacteria
- Kingdom: Pseudomonadati
- Phylum: Pseudomonadota
- Class: Gammaproteobacteria
- Order: Oceanospirillales
- Family: Halomonadaceae
- Genus: Halomonas
- Species: H. venusta

Binomial name
- Halomonas venusta Dobson and Franzmann 1996

Species of bacterium

Halomonas venusta is a Gram-negative halophilic Pseudomonadota, first described as Alcaligenes venustus (Baumann et al. 1972) and later reclassified as Halomonas venusta, along with other species when the genera Deleya (Baumann et al. 1983), Halomonas (Vreeland et al. 1980), and Halovibrio (Fendrich 1988) and the species Paracoccus halodenitrificans (Robinson and Gibbons 1952) were unified into a single genus, Halomonas, while the genus Zymobacter was placed in the family Halomonadaceae. The name stems from the Latin noun venusta which means "lovely" or "beautiful". It was originally isolated in marine water from Hawaii.
