= Halotalea =

Scientific classification
- Domain: Bacteria
- Kingdom: Pseudomonadati
- Phylum: Pseudomonadota
- Class: Gammaproteobacteria
- Order: Oceanospirillales
- Family: Halomonadaceae
- Genus: Halotalea; Ntougias et al. 2007

Species
- H. alkalilenta

Genus of bacteria

Halotalea is a gram-negative, obligate aerobic, non-spore-forming, osmotolerant, alkalitolerant and motile genus from the family of Halomonadaceae, with currently one known species; Halotalea alkalilenta.
