= Halovibrio =

Scientific classification
- Domain: Bacteria
- Kingdom: Pseudomonadati
- Phylum: Pseudomonadota
- Class: Gammaproteobacteria
- Order: Oceanospirillales
- Family: Halomonadaceae
- Genus: Halovibrio; Fendrich 1989

Species
- Halovibrio denitrificans Halovibrio salipaludis Halovibrio variabilis

Genus of bacteria

Halovibrio is a genus of bacteria from the family Halomonadaceae.
