= Cobetia =

Scientific classification
- Domain: Bacteria
- Kingdom: Pseudomonadati
- Phylum: Pseudomonadota
- Class: Gammaproteobacteria
- Order: Oceanospirillales
- Family: Halomonadaceae
- Genus: Cobetia; Arahal et al. 2002

Species
- Cobetia amphilecti Cobetia crustatorum Cobetia litoralis Cobetia marina Cobetia pacifica

Genus of bacteria

Cobetia is a genus of bacteria. Members belonging to this genus are Gram-negative, aerobic and halotolerant bacteria.
