= Alcaligenes aquatilis =

Scientific classification
- Domain: Bacteria
- Kingdom: Pseudomonadati
- Phylum: Pseudomonadota
- Class: Betaproteobacteria
- Order: Burkholderiales
- Family: Alcaligenaceae
- Genus: Alcaligenes
- Species: A. aquatilis

Binomial name
- Alcaligenes aquatilis Van Trappen et al. 2005

Type strain
- CCUG 50924, CIP 108999, LMG 22996, R-21911, R-21911 QC/Q3, Tan 797, Van Trappen R-21911

Species of bacterium

Alcaligenes aquatilis is a rod-shaped, Gram-negative, motile bacterium with peritrichous flagella, meaning flagella distributed over the cell surface. It was originally isolated from sediments in the Weser Estuary, Germany, and from a salt marsh on Shem Creek in Charleston Harbor, United States. It has since been found in Quintero Bay, Chile, among other locations. A. aquatilis has demonstrated the ability to remove ammonium, control cyanobacteria populations, and break down synthetic organic dyes and pharmaceutical drugs, indicating potential applications in wastewater treatment. It is also capable of metabolizing hydrocarbons, which may make it useful in the bioremediation of oil spills and in desalination treatment.

== History ==
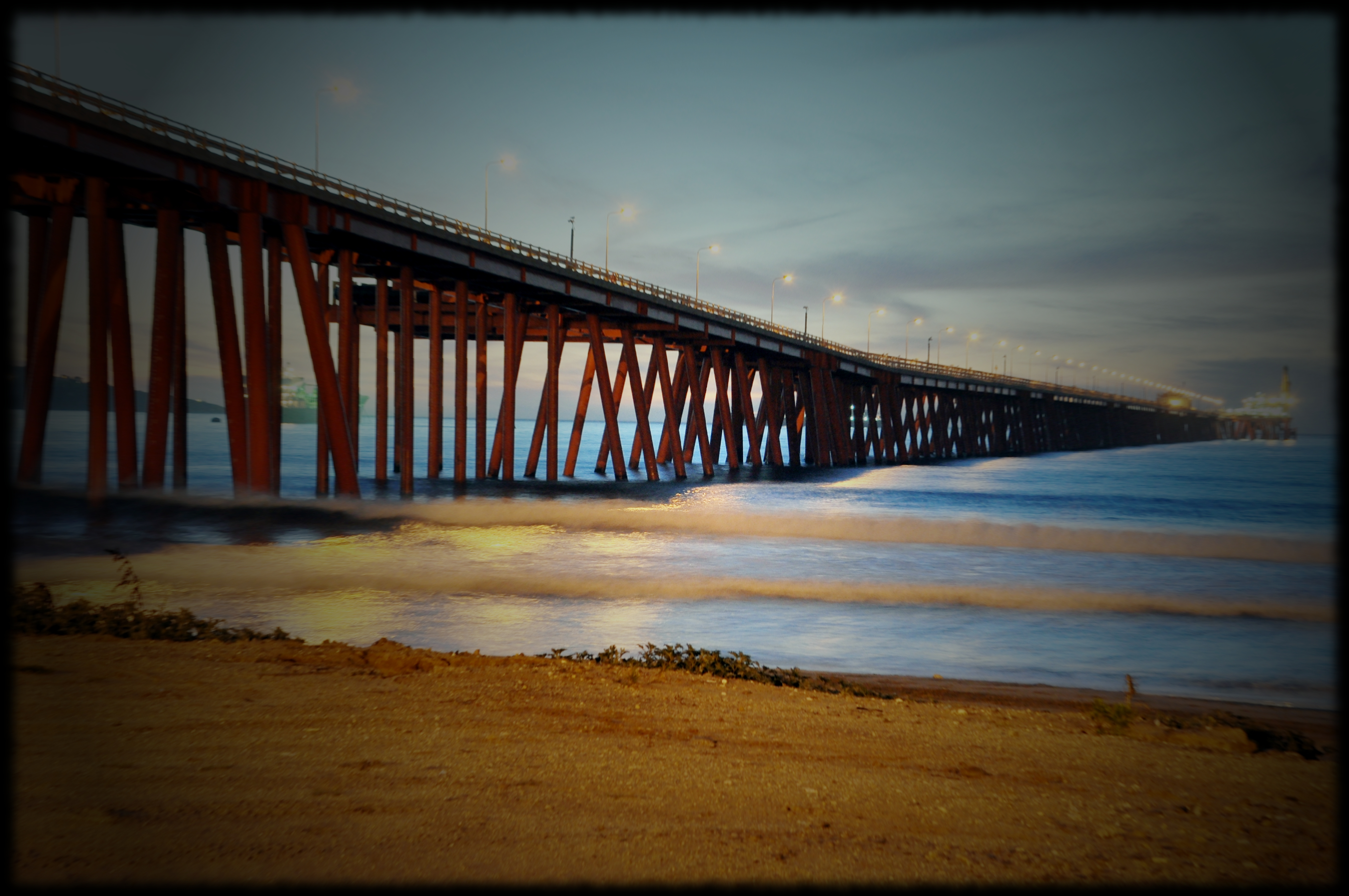
Bay of Quintero

In 2005, Van Trappen et al. isolated the bacterium from sediments in Weser Estuary, Germany, and from a salt marsh on Shem Creek in Charleston Harbor, United States. The genus Alcaligenes, established by Castellani and Chalmers in 1919, has undergone several taxonomic changes; its type species is Alcaligenes faecalis. Several strains of A. aquatilis have been isolated from a variety of locations. Strain QD168 was isolated from crude oil-polluted sediments in Quintero Bay, Chile. Strain 393 was isolated from a washroom sink in a hospital intensive care unit in Pakistan in July 2016.

== Genome ==
The genome of A. aquatilis has been sequenced for several strains. In strain QD168, the genome consists of a single circular chromosome with 4,323,879 base pairs and a G+C content of 56.3%, meaning 56.3% of its DNA bases are guanine or cytosine. Genome annotation of QD168 identified 3,892 coding sequences, which are DNA regions predicted to encode proteins. The QD168 genome sequence is available through GenBank, the European Nucleotide Archive, and the DNA Data Bank of Japan.

== Morphology and biochemistry ==
A. aquatilis is a rod-shaped, Gram-negative, motile bacterium with cells about 1.75 micrometers (μm) long and 0.9 μm wide. It has been shown to grow at temperatures ranging from 4-37 °C, with optimal growth at 21 °C. A. aquatilis forms circular colonies that are either yellow or non-pigmented, depending on the strain.

== Applications ==
=== Nitrogen removal ===
A. aquatilis strain AS1, isolated from activated sludge, has been identified as a heterotrophic nitrification–aerobic denitrification (HNAD) bacterium. HNAD is a process in which nitrogen and organic carbon are removed under aerobic conditions and can be useful in biological wastewater treatment.

HNAD can improve nitrogen removal in biological wastewater treatment by functioning under completely aerobic conditions, balancing pH through simultaneous denitrification, saving space and construction costs, and reducing both energy consumption and carbon emissions. The efficiency of an HNAD performing bacterium depends on the range of carbon sources it can utilize as well as the pH it can survive in.

In studies of piggery wastewater, strain AS1 proliferated during treatment and removed nitrogen under high-ammonia conditions. A. aquatilis has rapid growth rates and can utilize various carbon substrates for electrons and energy, making the microbe advantageous for Biological Nitrogen Removal (BNR) systems. In piggery wastewater with ammonium nitrogen (NH_{4}^{+}-N), ammonia removal efficiency was as high as 90% after 24 hours of cultivation with A. aquatilis, and then increased further to 95.5% after 36 hours. In comparison, the control condition without A. aquatilis had the highest NH_{4}^{+}-N removal efficiency of only 59.2% after 72 hours of treatment.

A. aquatilis was found to have higher ammonia removal efficiencies in wastewater than many other HNAD bacteria such as Acinetobacter sp. T1, Pseudomonas stutzeri SDU10, and Alcaligenes faecalis WT14.

=== Potential control of cyanobacteria ===
The interaction between A. aquatilis and cyanobacteria has attracted attention because of its potential applications in algal biotechnology. In co-culture, A. aquatilis showed antagonistic effects against the cyanobacterium Lyngbya aestuarii. The bacterium produced compounds including phenol, tannins, amino acids, and hydroxamate siderophores, and showed cellulase and protease activity; these factors were associated with reduced cyanobacterial growth and biomass.

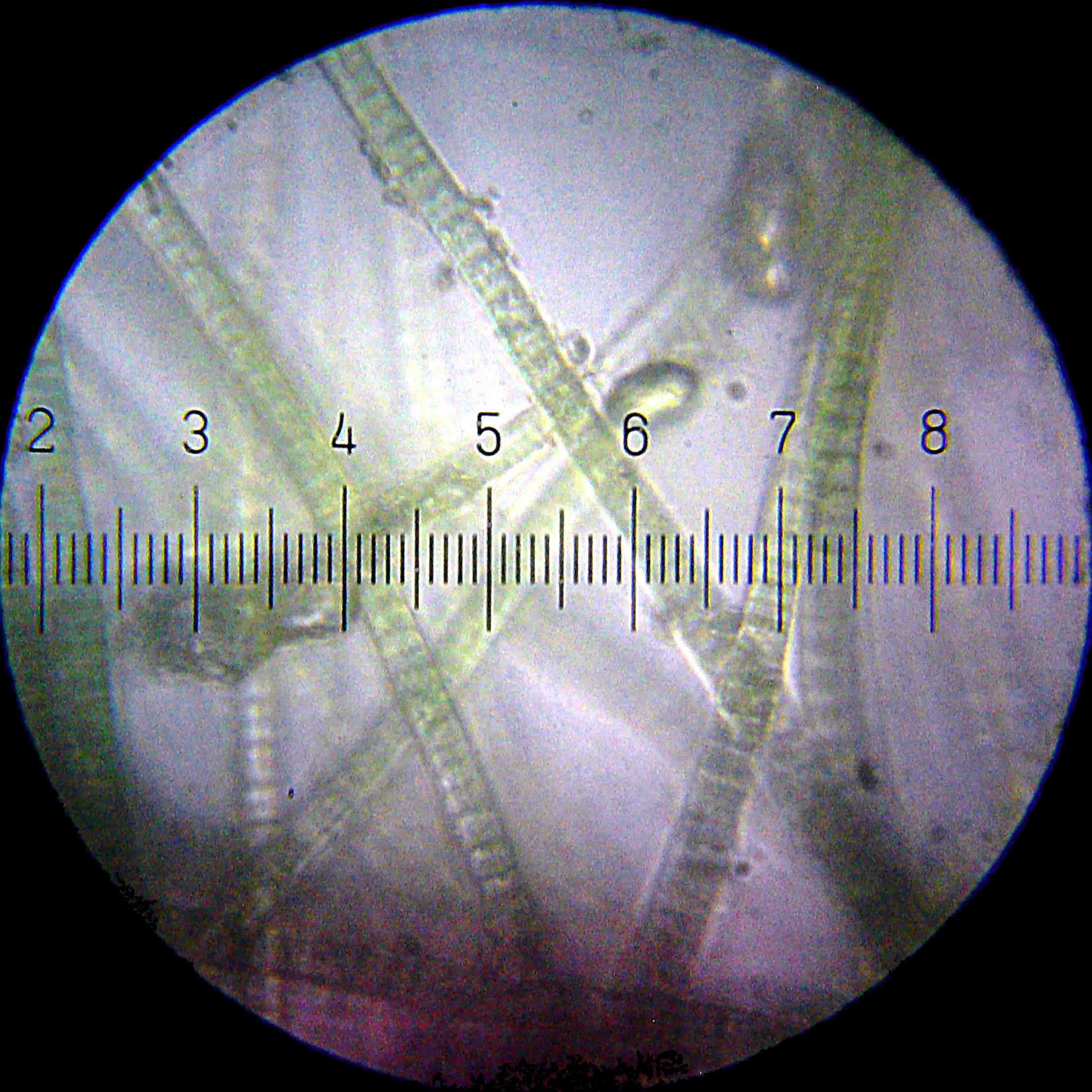
Filamentous Cyanobacteria under a microscope

In zone-inhibition assays using BG-11 medium, higher concentrations of A. aquatilis were associated with reduced growth of cyanobacteria. An A. aquatilis density of 8.9 × 10^{6} cells mL^{−1} resulted in a 49.83% decrease in cyanobacterial biomass after incubation.

The inhibitory mechanism appears to involve algicide activity by A. aquatilis or its associated bacteria. In one study, A. aquatilis formed an inhibition zone when inoculated with cyanobacteria, suggesting that it may inhibit cyanobacteria by releasing substances rather than by direct attachment.

The potential use of A. aquatilis to control cyanobacteria may be significant because some cyanobacteria can produce toxic substances that negatively affect aquatic systems. However, its use in environmental or industrial settings remains limited by factors such as the specificity of its antagonistic activity and the need for further research on long-term efficacy and safety.

=== Desalination ===
Desalination can help address freshwater scarcity by removing ions from seawater. One concern in desalination is scale deposition, caused by ions such as magnesium (Mg^{2+}) and calcium (Ca^{2+}), which can affect reverse-osmosis membranes and water-treatment systems. A. aquatilis may be useful as a pretreatment in desalination because it can remove Ca^{2+} and Mg^{2+} from seawater through microbial-induced carbonate precipitation (MICP). In one study, it was found that the surface of A. aquatilis contains a negatively charged extracellular polymeric substance (EPS) that adsorbs to the positively-charged Ca^{2+} and Mg^{2+}, removing the cations with efficiencies as high as 93% and 72%, respectively.

Heavy metals in seawater are also of concern because of their toxicity and difficulty of removal. A. aquatilis can use amino acids to produce carbonate, forming precipitates that removes ions from solution. The EPS can facilitate nickel-carbonate precipitation, removing up to 92% of soluble nickel.

One concern with MICP is that it generates ammonia as a potentially toxic byproduct. However, A. aquatilis can remove ammonia after the MICP process under oxygen-rich conditions. This may reduce the need for additional desalination and pollution-removal processes.

=== Decolorization ability ===
Synthetic organic dyes are widely used in textiles, tanning, cosmetics and paper industries. Many synthetic organic dyes are toxic to aquatic organisms, obstruct light penetration in aquatic ecosystems, and reduce oxygen transfer. This presents a risk to both aquatic ecosystems and organisms higher in the food chain such as humans.

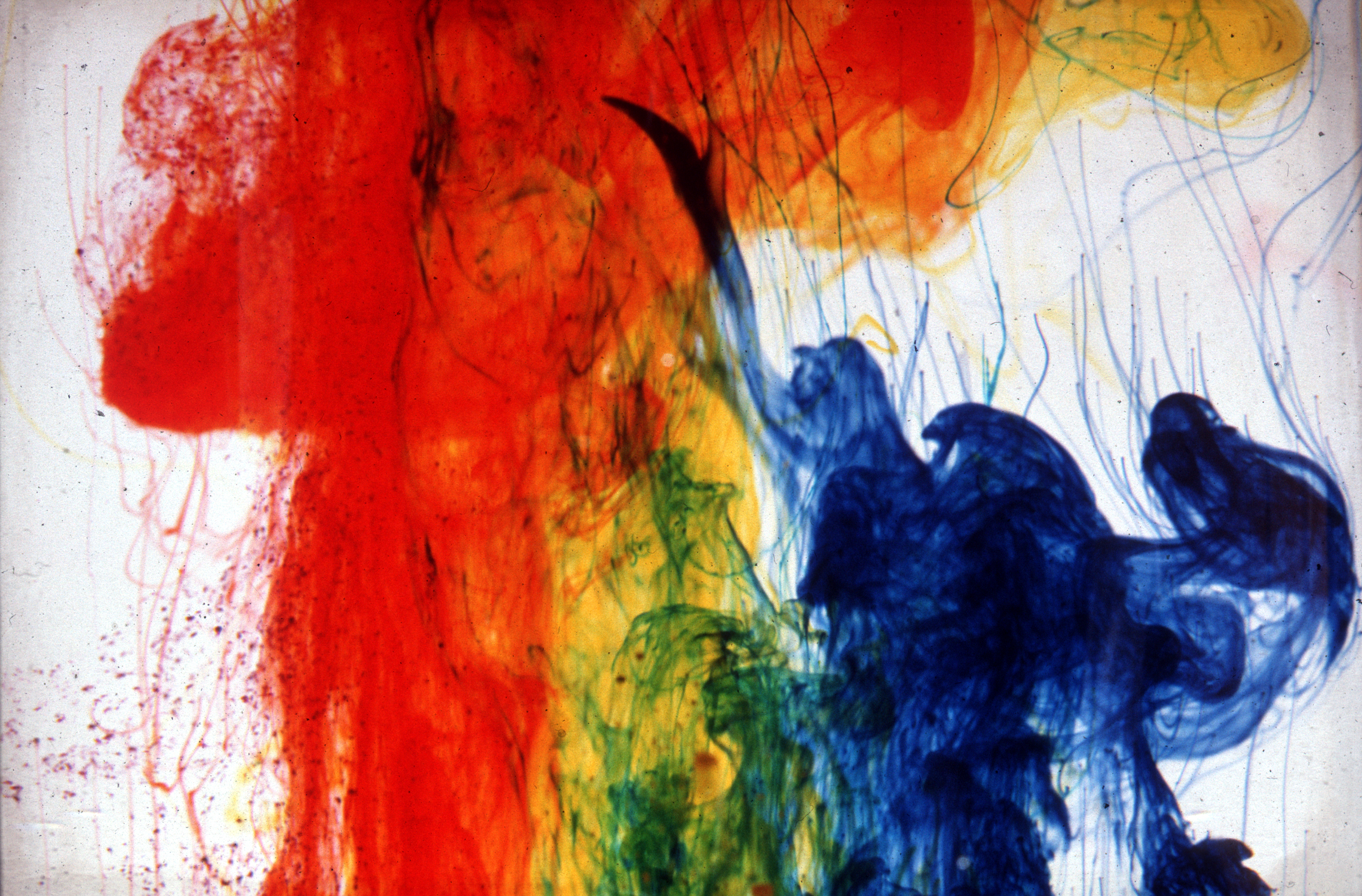
Textile dyes in water.

Azo dyes are the largest class of synthetic dyes. A. aquatilis strain 3c was found to decolorize 82% of Synazol red 6HBN, an azo dye, after four days of static incubation at 37 °C and pH 7. The study confirmed cleavage of the dye's azo bond using several chemical analyses, indicating that A. aquatilis degraded the dye rather than only removing its color. The study also found that dye decolorization was associated with increased bacterial growth and that the treated wastewater did not inhibit the growth of other microbes.

Another study found that the A. aquatilis type strain LMG 22996 reduced color by 86% when cultured in textile-printing wastewater inoculated with cow dung, jaggery, and urea. The same study reported reductions in biological oxygen demand and chemical oxygen demand of 70% and 81%, respectively.

Because textile production is concentrated in major exporting countries such as China, Bangladesh, Vietnam, and India, dye-contaminated wastewater remains a concern in areas with large textile industries. Together, the findings suggest that A. aquatilis may have potential for the bioremediation of dye-contaminated wastewater.

=== Hydrocarbon breakdown ===
Genetic analysis suggests that A. aquatilis can break down hydrocarbons, an important class of environmental pollutants. Strain QD168 contains 95 genes encoding proteins for seven central aromatic catabolic pathways and 16 peripheral catabolic pathways or reactions for aromatic compounds. Analysis of strain BU33N found 97 genes related to the metabolism of aromatic compounds.

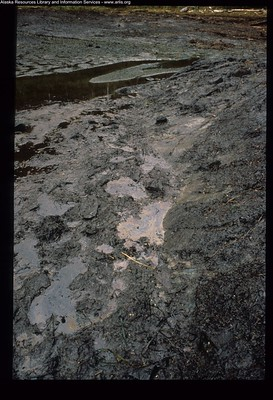
A beach in Prince William Sound is polluted by the Exxon Valdez oil spill.

Growth assays showed that A. aquatilis can metabolize several compounds found in pollutants such as crude oil, as well as benzene derivatives and straight-chain hydrocarbons. Strain BU33N also showed emulsification activity, indicating biosurfactant production, which may help make hydrocarbons more available for degradation.

Benzene breakdown is of interest because benzene is found at oil-polluted sites and is highly toxic. Transcriptional analysis found that A. aquatilis degrades benzene by converting it to a phenol intermediate, and then to catechol. From catechol, A. aquatilis uses six enzymes to form acetyl-CoA and succinyl-CoA.

The ability of A. aquatilis to degrade hydrocarbons suggests potential for use in the bioremediation of oil-polluted environments.

=== Degradation of pharmaceutical drugs ===
A. aquatilis has been shown to use Diclofenac (DCF) as a carbon source. DCF is a common nonsteroidal anti-inflammatory drug (NSAID) used to treat pain, fever, and inflammation. It can enter wastewater after human metabolism and excretion and is present in aquatic environments. DCF can induce cellular toxicity by increasing the production of reactive oxygen species, making the ability of A. aquatilis to use it as a carbon source notable. However, the exact mechanism remains unclear, and further research is needed to determine whether A. aquatilis could be used in the bioremediation of pharmaceutical pollution.
