= Salinicola salarius =

Scientific classification
- Domain: Bacteria
- Kingdom: Pseudomonadati
- Phylum: Pseudomonadota
- Class: Gammaproteobacteria
- Order: Oceanospirillales
- Family: Halomonadaceae
- Genus: Salinicola
- Species: S. salarius

Binomial name
- Salinicola salarius (Kim et al. 2007) de la Haba et al. 2010

Synonyms
- Halomonas salaria Kim et al. 2007

Species of bacterium

Salinicola salarius is a Gram-negative, moderately halophilic, piezophilic bacterium that requires pressures of 102 MPa to grow. The species was first isolated from a salt water sample from Anmyeondo, Korea and was formally described in 2007. S salarius cells are aerobic, Gram-negative, non-spore-forming rods (0.8–0.9x1.3–1.7 μm) that form yellow, smooth, translucent, circular colonies with entire edges. The oxidase- and catalase-positive cells are motile and possess lateral/polar flagella. Growth occurs at 10–45 °C (optimally at 25–30 °C) and at pH 5–10 (optimum pH 7–8). The strain is able to grow at salinities between 0 and 25% NaCl (optimum 10–20% NaCl).

S.I. Paul et al. (2021) isolated and identified salt tolerant Salinicola salarius from marine sponges (Niphates erecta, Hemimycale columella) of the Saint Martin's Island Area of the Bay of Bengal, Bangladesh.

== Biochemical characteristics of Salinicola salarius ==
Colony, morphological, physiological, and biochemical characteristics of Salinicola salarius are shown in the Table below.

Test type	Test	Characteristics
Colony characters	Size	Medium
Colony characters	Type	Round
Colony characters	Color	Yellowish
Colony characters	Shape	Convex
Morphological characters	Shape	Rod
Physiological characters	Motility	+
Physiological characters	Growth at 6.5% NaCl	+
Biochemical characters	Gram's staining	–
Biochemical characters	Oxidase	+
Biochemical characters	Catalase	+
Biochemical characters	Oxidative-Fermentative	Oxidative
Biochemical characters	Motility	+
Biochemical characters	Methyl Red	+
Biochemical characters	Voges-Proskauer	–
Biochemical characters	Indole	–
Biochemical characters	H_{2}S Production	–
Biochemical characters	Urease	–
Biochemical characters	Nitrate reductase	–
Biochemical characters	β-Galactosidase	+
Hydrolysis of	Gelatin	–
Hydrolysis of	Aesculin	+
Hydrolysis of	Casein	–
Hydrolysis of	Tween 40	–
Hydrolysis of	Tween 60	–
Hydrolysis of	Tween 80	–
Acid production from	Glycerol	–
Acid production from	Galactose	+
Acid production from	D-Glucose	+
Acid production from	D-Fructose	+
Acid production from	D-Mannose	+
Acid production from	Mannitol	–
Acid production from	N-Acetylglucosamine	+
Acid production from	Amygdalin	+
Acid production from	Maltose	V
Acid production from	D-Melibiose	+
Acid production from	D-Trehalose	+
Acid production from	Glycogen	+
Acid production from	D-Turanose	+

Note: + = Positive, – =Negative, V =Variable (+/–)
