= Modicisalibacter =

Scientific classification
- Domain: Bacteria
- Kingdom: Pseudomonadati
- Phylum: Pseudomonadota
- Class: Gammaproteobacteria
- Order: Oceanospirillales
- Family: Halomonadaceae
- Genus: Modicisalibacter; Ben Ali Gam et al. 2007

Species
- M. tunisiensis

Genus of bacteria

Modicisalibacter is a Gram-negative, non-spore-forming, aerobic, moderately halophilic and motile genus from the family of Halomonadaceae, with one known species (Modicisalibacter tunisiensis).
