= Kushneria =

Scientific classification
- Domain: Bacteria
- Kingdom: Pseudomonadati
- Phylum: Pseudomonadota
- Class: Gammaproteobacteria
- Order: Oceanospirillales
- Family: Halomonadaceae
- Genus: Kushneria; Sánchez-Porro et al. 2009

Species
- Kushneria aurantia Kushneria avicenniae Kushneria endophytica Kushneria indalinina Kushneria konosiri Kushneria marisflavi Kushneria pakistanensis Kushneria phosphatilytica Kushneria phyllosphaerae Kushneria sinocarnis

Genus of bacteria

Kushneria is a genus of bacteria from the family Halomonadaceae.
