= Halomonas organivorans =

Scientific classification
- Domain: Bacteria
- Kingdom: Pseudomonadati
- Phylum: Pseudomonadota
- Class: Gammaproteobacteria
- Order: Oceanospirillales
- Family: Halomonadaceae
- Genus: Halomonas
- Species: H. organivorans

Binomial name
- Halomonas organivorans García et al. 2004

Species of bacterium

Halomonas organivorans is a species of gram-negative bacteria from the order Oceanospirillales. H. organivorans is a halophilic bacterium that is able to degrade aromatic compounds. It's considered a potentially useful bacteria for decontamination of polluted saline habitats. Its type strain is G-16.1^{T} (=CECT 5995^{T} =CCM 7142^{T}).
