= Halovibrio variabilis =

Scientific classification
- Domain: Bacteria
- Kingdom: Pseudomonadati
- Phylum: Pseudomonadota
- Class: Gammaproteobacteria
- Order: Oceanospirillales
- Family: Halomonadaceae
- Genus: Halovibrio
- Species: H. variabilis

Binomial name
- Halovibrio variabilis Fendrich 1989

Synonyms
- Halomonas variabilis

Species of bacterium

Halovibrio variabilis is a Gram-negative, aerobic, mesophilic and heterotrophic bacterium from the genus Halovibrio. H. variabilis was first isolated from the Great Salt Lake, Utah. The species is halophilic.
