= Halomonas pacifica =

Scientific classification
- Domain: Bacteria
- Kingdom: Pseudomonadati
- Phylum: Pseudomonadota
- Class: Gammaproteobacteria
- Order: Oceanospirillales
- Family: Halomonadaceae
- Genus: Halomonas
- Species: H. pacifica

Binomial name
- Halomonas pacifica (Baumann et al. 1972) Dobson and Franzmann 1996

Type strain
- ACAM 345, ATCC 27122, Baumann 62, CCUG 16079, CECT 574, CGMCC 1.2314, CIP 103200, CIP 74.05, DSM 4742, DSMZ 4742, IAM 12553, JCM 20633, KCTC 2683, LMG 3446, NBRC 102220, NCIMB 1977, NCMB 1977

Synonyms
- Alcaligenes pacificus Baumann et al. 1972; Deleya pacifica (Baumann et al. 1972) Baumann et al. 1983

Species of bacterium

Halomonas pacifica is a bacterium of the genus Halomonas. The species has also been isolated from a saline lake in South Libya.
