= Halomonas cupida =

Scientific classification
- Domain: Bacteria
- Kingdom: Pseudomonadati
- Phylum: Pseudomonadota
- Class: Gammaproteobacteria
- Order: Oceanospirillales
- Family: Halomonadaceae
- Genus: Halomonas
- Species: H. cupida

Binomial name
- Halomonas cupida (Baumann et al. 1972) Dobson and Franzmann 1996

Type strain
- ATCC 27124, Baumann 79, CCUG 16075, CECT 5001, CGMCC 1.2312, CIP 103199, CIP 74.06, CIP 74.06.103199, DSM 4740, IAM 12552, IAMI 12552T, JCM 20632, KCTC 12173, LMG 3448, NBRC 102219, NCIB 1978, NCIMB 1978, NCMB 1978

Synonyms
- Alcaligenes cupidus Baumann et al. 1972; Deleya cupida (Baumann et al. 1972) Baumann et al. 1983

Species of bacterium

Halomonas cupida is a bacterium from the genus Halomonas which was isolated from seawater.
