= Felisa Wolfe-Simon =

American geomicrobiologist

Felisa Lauren Wolfe-Simon
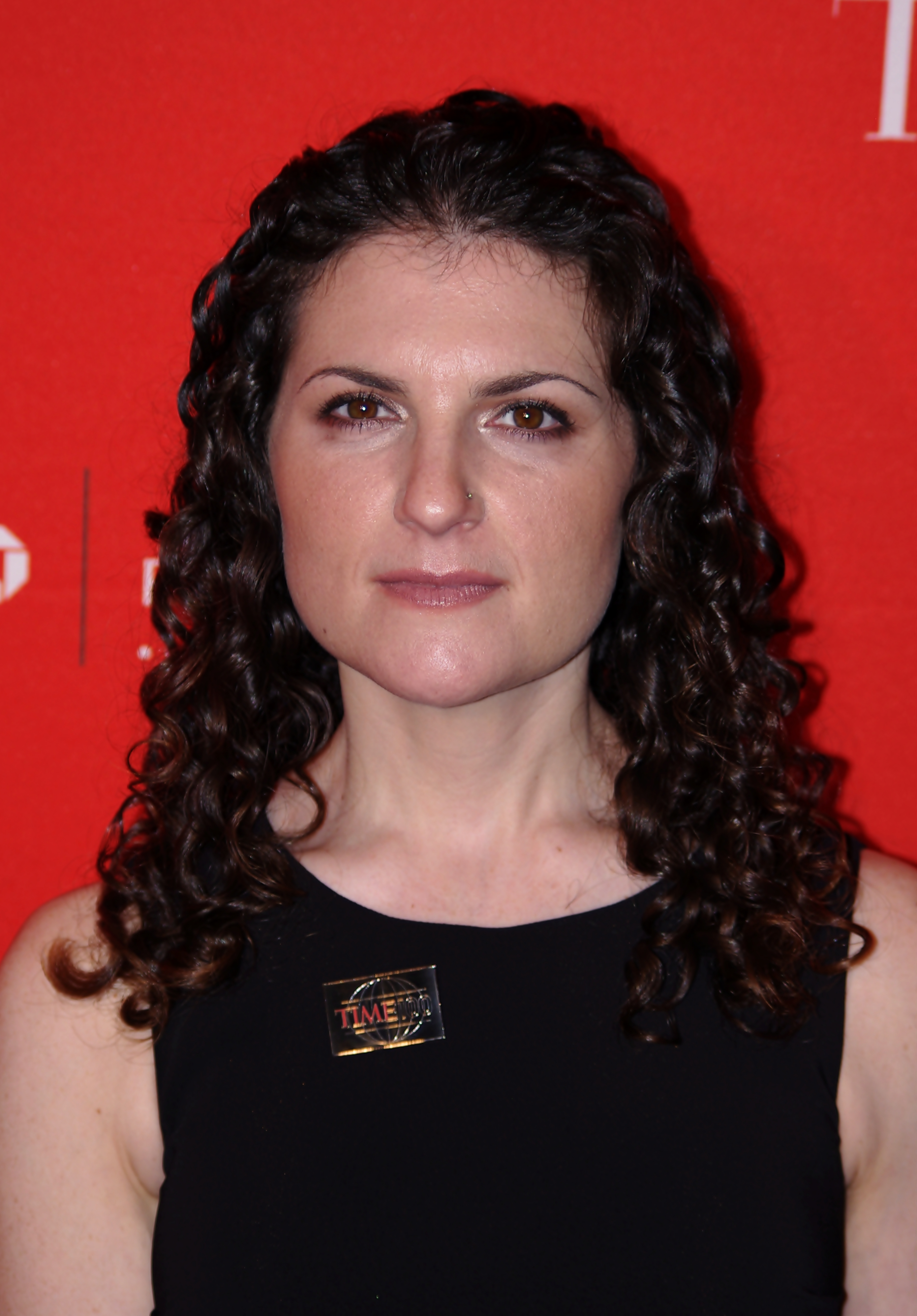
- Wolfe-Simon at the 2011 Time 100 gala
- Born: Felisa Lauren Wolfe
- Education: Rutgers University Institute of Marine and Coastal Sciences (Ph.D.); Oberlin College (B.A.); Oberlin Conservatory of Music (B.M.)
- Known for: GFAJ-1 bacterium
- Scientific career
- Fields: Biochemistry, Microbiology, Astrobiology, Geochemistry, Geomicrobiology, Oceanography
- Workplaces: Lawrence Berkeley National Laboratory; NASA Astrobiology Institute; US Geological Survey; Rutgers University

Felisa Wolfe-Simon is an American microbial geobiologist and biogeochemist. In 2010, Wolfe-Simon led a team that discovered GFAJ-1, an extremophile bacterium that they claimed was capable of substituting arsenic for a small percentage of its phosphorus to sustain its growth, thus advancing the remarkable possibility of non-RNA/DNA-based genetics. However, these conclusions were immediately debated and criticized in correspondence to the original journal of publication, and were widely disbelieved by scientists. In 2012, two reports refuting the most significant aspects of the original results were published in the same journal in which the original findings had been previously published. On July 24, 2025, Science formally retracted the 2010 paper, citing expanded retraction criteria and concluding that the experiments did not support the paper's key conclusions; the study's authors objected to the decision.

== Education and early career ==
Wolfe-Simon did her undergraduate studies at Oberlin College and completed a Bachelor of Arts in Biology and Chemistry and a Bachelor of Music in Oboe Performance and Ethnomusicology at the Oberlin Conservatory of Music. She received her Doctor of Philosophy in oceanography from the Institute of Marine and Coastal Sciences at Rutgers University in 2006 with a dissertation titled The Role and Evolution of Superoxide Dismutases in Algae. Later Wolfe-Simon was a NASA research fellow in residence at the US Geological Survey and a member of the NASA Astrobiology Institute. In 2006 Wolfe-Simon was awarded a National Science Foundation Minority Postdoctoral Research Fellowship to support work done at Harvard University and Arizona State University.

== GFAJ-1 controversy ==
Wolfe-Simon's research focuses on evolutionary microbiology and exotic metabolic pathways. At a conference in 2008 and subsequent 2009 paper, Wolfe-Simon, Paul Davies and Ariel Anbar proposed that arsenate (AsO^{3−}_{4}) could serve as a substitute for phosphate (PO^{3−}_{4}) in various forms of biochemistry. According to Paul Davies, Wolfe-Simon was the one who had the "critical insight" that arsenic might be able to substitute for phosphorus. As late as March 2010, she had been hinting of some shadow biosphere results to the press.

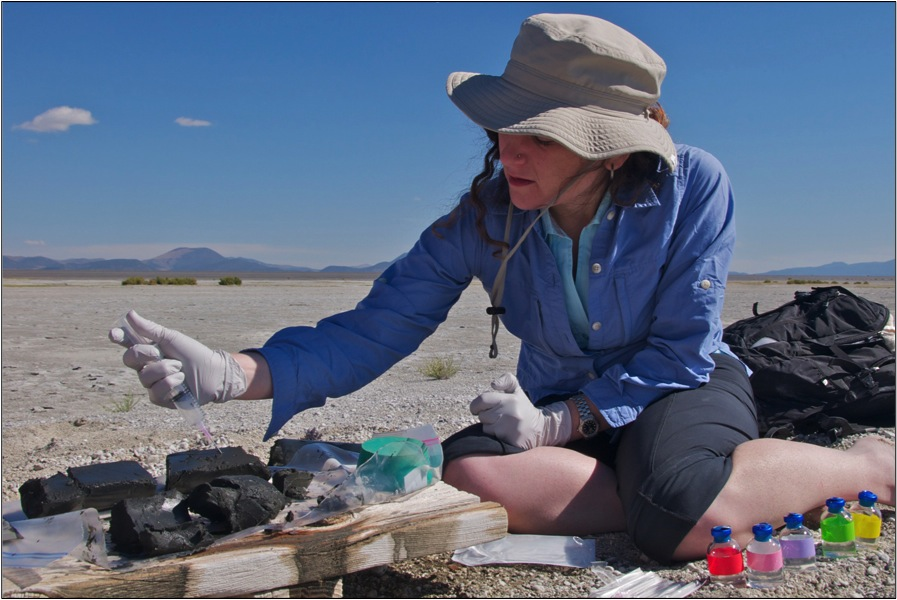
Wolfe-Simon processing mud at Mono Lake, 2010

Wolfe-Simon then led a search for such an organism by targeting the naturally occurring arsenic-rich Mono Lake, California. This search led to the discovery of the bacterium GFAJ-1, which her team claimed in a Science on-line article in December 2010 was able to incorporate arsenate as a substitute for a small percentage of the typical phosphate in its DNA and other essential biomolecules. If correct, this would be the only known organism to be capable of replacing phosphorus in its DNA and other vital biochemical functions. The Science publication and an hour-long NASA news conference were widely publicized and led to "wild speculations on the Web about extraterrestrial life". Wolfe-Simon was the only one of the paper's authors at that news conference. The news conference was promptly met with criticism by scientists and journalists. In the following month, Wolfe-Simon (and her co-authors and NASA) responded to criticisms through an online FAQ and an exclusive interview with a Science reporter, but also announced they would not respond further outside scientific peer-review. In April 2011 Time magazine named Wolfe-Simon one of that year's Time 100 people.

The Science article "A Bacterium That Can Grow by Using Arsenic Instead of Phosphorus" appeared in the June 3, 2011, print version of Science; it had remained on the "Publication ahead of print" ScienceXpress page for six months after acceptance for publication. However, Rosemary Redfield and other researchers from the University of British Columbia and Princeton University performed studies in which they used a variety of different techniques to investigate the presence of arsenic in the DNA of GFAJ-1 and published their results in early 2012. The group found no detectable arsenic in the DNA of the bacterium. In addition, they found that arsenate did not help the strain grow when phosphate was limited, further suggesting that arsenate does not replace the role of phosphate.

Following the publication of the articles challenging the conclusions of the original Science article first describing GFAJ-1, David Sanders on the website Retraction Watch argued that the original article should be retracted because of misrepresentation of critical data. In October 2024, Science editor Holden Thorp notified the article's authors of its intention to retract, arguing that, whereas formerly only misconduct justified retraction, current practice allows it for unreliability. The paper was retracted in 2025 with "no evidence of misconduct by researchers".

== Later career ==
Wolfe-Simon left USGS in May 2011. She maintains she did not leave voluntarily, but was "effectively evicted" from the USGS group. She briefly worked at Lawrence Berkeley National Laboratory but the GFAJ-1 controversy impaired her ability to obtain funding and she left the research career-path. She subsequently worked mainly as a performer and teacher of the oboe, and partly in science-adjacent roles including organising seminars at Mills College at Northeastern University, consulting for biotech startups, and industrial microbiology for bakeries. In 2024 she returned part time to scientific research after receiving funding "through a NASA workshop" to investigate magnetotactic bacteria.

== See also ==
- Hypothetical types of biochemistry
- Prebiotic arsenic
