= Azohydromonas =

Scientific classification
- Domain: Bacteria
- Kingdom: Pseudomonadati
- Phylum: Pseudomonadota
- Class: Betaproteobacteria
- Order: Burkholderiales
- Family: Alcaligenaceae
- Genus: Azohydromonas; Xie and Yokota 2005

Type species
- Azohydromonas lata

Species
- A. australica A. lata

Genus of bacteria

Azohydromonas is a genus of bacteria from the family of Alcaligenaceae.
