= Cobetia marina =

Scientific classification
- Domain: Bacteria
- Kingdom: Pseudomonadati
- Phylum: Pseudomonadota
- Class: Gammaproteobacteria
- Order: Oceanospirillales
- Family: Halomonadaceae
- Genus: Cobetia
- Species: C. marina

Binomial name
- Cobetia marina (Cobet et al. 1970) Arahal et al. 2002

Synonyms
- Deleya marina (Cobet et al. 1970) Baumann et al. 1983; Halomonas marina (Cobet et al. 1970) Dobson and Franzmann 1996; Arthrobacter marinus Cobet et al. 1970; Pseudomonas marina (Cobet et al. 1970) Baumann et al. 1972

Species of bacterium

Cobetia marina is a Gram-negative halophilic marine bacterium.

== History ==
In 2013, Halomonas halodurans was found to be a later description of the same bacteria, and was therefore reclassified as Cobetia marina.
