= Choline monooxygenase =

Class of enzymes

choline monooxygenase

Identifiers
- EC no.: 1.14.15.7

Databases
- IntEnz: IntEnz view
- BRENDA: BRENDA entry
- ExPASy: NiceZyme view
- KEGG: KEGG entry
- MetaCyc: metabolic pathway
- PRIAM: profile
- PDB structures: RCSB PDB PDBe PDBsum
- Gene Ontology: AmiGO / QuickGO
Search
- PMC: articles
- PubMed: articles
- NCBI: proteins

In enzymology, a choline monooxygenase (EC 1.14.15.7) is an enzyme that catalyzes the chemical reaction

choline + O_{2} + 2 reduced ferredoxin + 2 H^{+} $\rightleftharpoons$ betaine aldehyde hydrate + H_{2}O + 2 oxidized ferredoxin

The 4 substrates of this enzyme are choline, O_{2}, reduced ferredoxin, and H^{+}, whereas its 3 products are betaine aldehyde hydrate, H_{2}O, and oxidized ferredoxin.

This enzyme belongs to the family of oxidoreductases, specifically those acting on paired donors, with O2 as oxidant and incorporation or reduction of oxygen. The oxygen incorporated need not be derived from O2 with reduced iron-sulfur protein as one donor, and incorporation o one atom of oxygen into the other donor. The systematic name of this enzyme class is choline, reduced-ferredoxin:oxygen oxidoreductase. This enzyme participates in glycine, serine and threonine metabolism.
