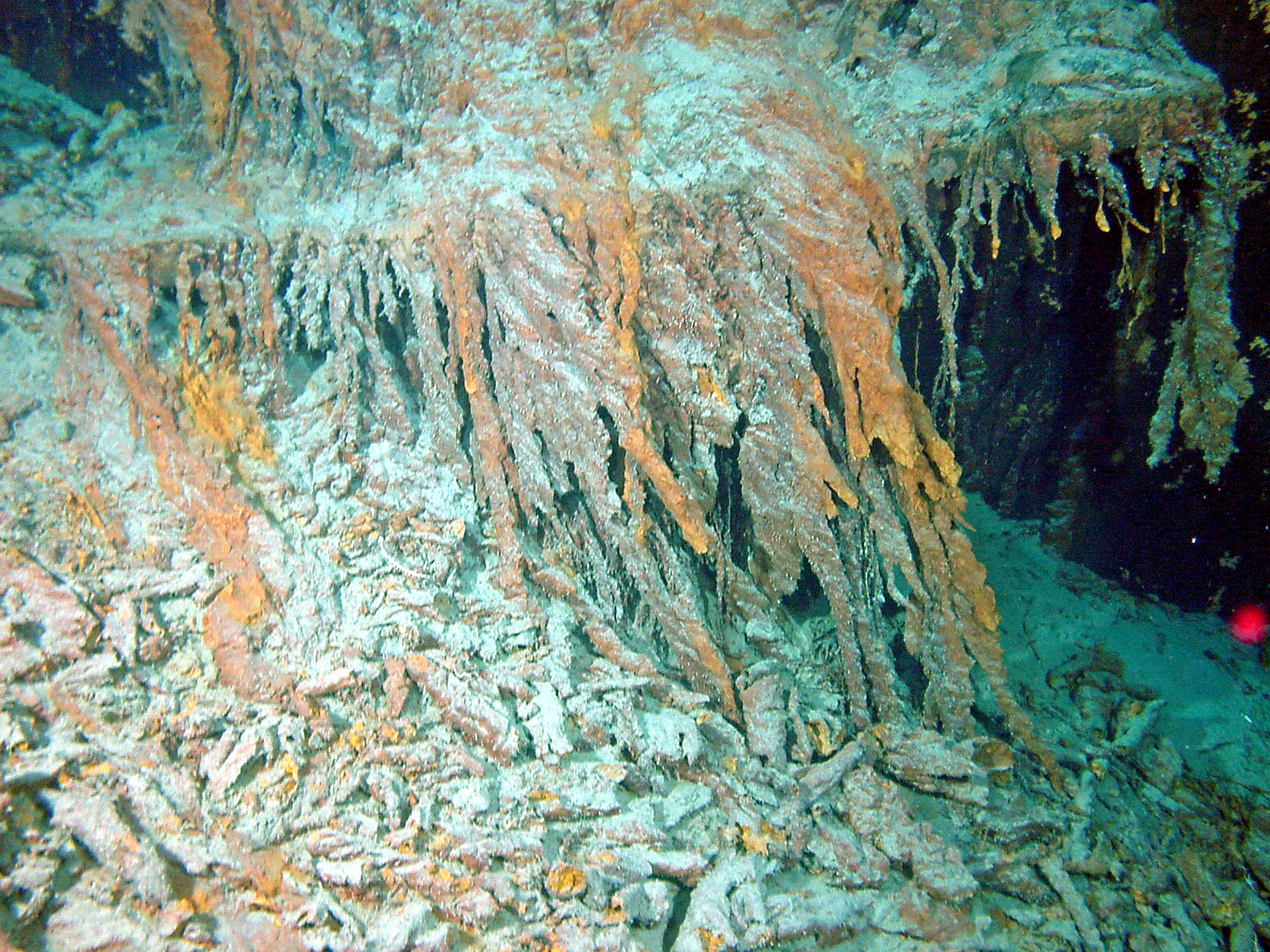
- Rusticles of the RMS Titanic containing H. titanicae

Scientific classification
- Domain: Bacteria
- Kingdom: Pseudomonadati
- Phylum: Pseudomonadota
- Class: Gammaproteobacteria
- Order: Oceanospirillales
- Family: Halomonadaceae
- Genus: Halomonas; Vreeland et al. 1980 emend. Dobson and Franzmann 1996

Type species
- Halomonas elongata

Species
- See text

= Halomonas =

Genus of bacteria

Halomonas is a genus of halophilic (salt-tolerating) bacteria. It grows over the range of 5 to 25% NaCl.

The type species of this genus is Halomonas elongata.

== Description ==
Members of Halomonas are Gram-negative, rod-shaped bacteria, generally 0.6-0.8 μm by 1.6-1.9 μm. They move by using flagella. They grow in the presence of oxygen, although some have been reported to be able to grow without oxygen. When grown on an agar plate, they form white/yellow colonies that turn light brown over time.

== Ecology ==
Halomonas species have been found in a broad variety of saline environments, including estuaries, the ocean, and saline lakes.

== Species ==
Many species of Halomonas have been described:

H. alimentaria
H. alkaliantarctica
H. alkaliphila
H. almeriensis
H. andesensis
H. anticariensis
H. aquamarina
H. arcis
H. axialensis
H. beimenensis
H. boliviensis
H. campaniensis
H. campisalis
H. caseinilytica
H. cerina
H. cibimaris
H. cupida
H. daqiaonensis
H. daqingensis
H. denitrificans
H. desiderata
H. elongata
H. eurihalina
H. flava
H. fontilapidosi
H. garicola
H. gomseomensis
H. gudaonensis
H. halmophila
H. halocynthiae
H. halodenitrificans
H. halophila
H. hamiltonii
H. heilongjiangensis
H. huangheensis
H. hydrothermalis
H. ilicicola
H. janggokensis
H. jeotgali
H. johnsoniae
H. kenyensis
H. koreensis
H. korlensis
H. kribbensis
H. lutea
H. lutescence
H. magadiensis
H. maura
H. meridiana
H. mongoliensis
H. muralis
H. nanhaiensis
H. neptunia
H. nitroreducens
H. olivaria
H. organivorans
H. pacifica
H. pantelleriensis
H. qiaohouensis
H. qijiaojingensis
H. ramblicola
H. rifensis
H. sabkhae
H. saccharevitans
H. salicampi
H. salifodinae
H. salina
H. sediminicola
H. shengliensis
H. sinaiensis
H. smyrnensis
H. songnenensis
H. stenophila
H. stevensii
H. subglaciescola
H. subterranea
H. sulfidaeris
H. taeanensis
H. titanicae
H. urumqiensis
H. variabilis
H. ventosae
H. venusta
H. vilamensis
H. xianhensis
H. xinjiangensis
H. zhangjiangensis
H. zincidurans

== Pathogenic potential ==
Certain species of Halomonas may display pathogenic potential in humans. In one study, three species were isolated from two patients suffering bacteremia in a dialysis center. The study hypothesized that the bicarbonate used in the dialysis fluid may have been contaminated by the bacteria.

== Health ==
Halomonas sp. KM-1 is used for industrial production of β-hydroxybutyric acid (BHB).

== Etymology ==
The name Halomonas derives from: Greek noun hals, halos (ἅλς, ἁλός), salt; and monas (μονάς), nominally meaning "a unit", but in effect meaning a bacterium; thus, salt (-tolerant) monad.

Members of the genus Halomonas can be referred to as halomonads (see Trivialisation of names).
