= Azohydromonas lata =

Scientific classification
- Domain: Bacteria
- Kingdom: Pseudomonadati
- Phylum: Pseudomonadota
- Class: Betaproteobacteria
- Order: Burkholderiales
- Family: Sphaerotilaceae
- Genus: Azohydromonas
- Species: A. lata

Binomial name
- Azohydromonas lata Palleroni and Palleroni 1978

Type strain
- ATCC 29712, BCRC 15440, CCM 4448, CCRC 15440, CCUG 10983, CCUG 31481, CCUG 7831, CIP 103458, CIP 13458T, DSM 1122, IAM 12599, ICIB 12188, ICPB 4234, JCM 20675, KCTC 2339, KCTC 2868, LMD 97.132, LMG 3321, LMG 3323, LMG 3326, N.J. Palleroni H-4, NBRC 102462, NCAIM B.01976, NCCB 97132, NCIB 12188, NCIMB 12188, Palleroni H-4

Synonyms
- Alcaligenes lactus

Species of bacterium

Azohydromonas lata is a gram-negative, hydrogen-using bacterium from the genus Azohydromonas. Alcaligenes latus has been reclassified as Azohydromonas lata.
