= L-2-hydroxycarboxylate dehydrogenase (NAD+) =

Class of enzymes

L-2-hydroxycarboxylate dehydrogenase (NAD^{+})
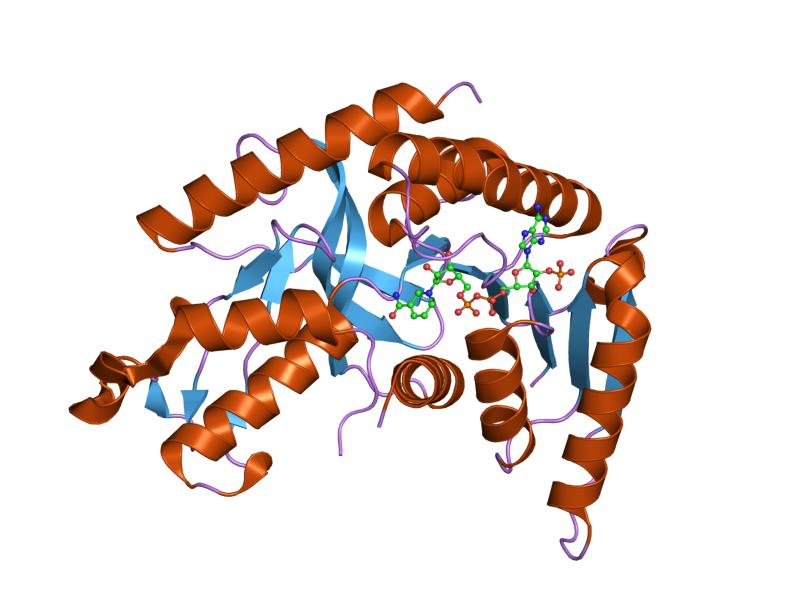

Identifiers
- EC no.: 1.1.1.337
- CAS no.: 81210-65-3

Databases
- IntEnz: IntEnz view
- BRENDA: BRENDA entry
- ExPASy: NiceZyme view
- KEGG: KEGG entry
- MetaCyc: metabolic pathway
- PRIAM: profile
- PDB structures: RCSB PDB PDBe PDBsum
Search
- PMC: articles
- PubMed: articles
- NCBI: proteins

L-2-hydroxycarboxylate dehydrogenase (NAD^{+}) (EC 1.1.1.337, (R)-sulfolactate:NAD^{+} oxidoreductase, L-sulfolactate dehydrogenase, (R)-sulfolactate dehydrogenase, L-2-hydroxyacid dehydrogenase (NAD^{+}), ComC) is an enzyme with systematic name (2S)-2-hydroxycarboxylate:NAD+ oxidoreductase. This enzyme catalyses the following chemical reaction

(2S)-2-hydroxycarboxylate + NAD^{+} $\rightleftharpoons$ 2-oxocarboxylate + NADH + H^{+}

The enzyme from the archaeon Methanocaldococcus jannaschii uses as a substrate multiple (S)-2-hydroxycarboxylates including (2R)-3-sulfolactate, (S)-malate, (S)-lactate, and (S)-2-hydroxyglutarate.
