= Chromohalobacter salexigens =

Scientific classification
- Domain: Bacteria
- Kingdom: Pseudomonadati
- Phylum: Pseudomonadota
- Class: Gammaproteobacteria
- Order: Oceanospirillales
- Family: Halomonadaceae
- Genus: Chromohalobacter
- Species: C. salexigens

Binomial name
- Chromohalobacter salexigens Arahal et al. 2001

Species of bacterium

Chromohalobacter salexigens is a gram negative, oxidase and catalase positive, rod shaped, motile and moderately halophilic species of marine bacteria. It was isolated from Bonaire, Netherlands Antilles, and from marine sponges of the Saint Martin's Island area of the Bay of Bengal, Bangladesh. Colonies are medium-sized, round and yellowish in color. The type strain is DSM 3043^{T} (= ATCC BAA-138^{T} = CECT 5384^{T} = CCM4921^{T} = CIP106854^{T} = NCIMB 13768^{T}). Its genome has been sequenced. It is a gamma-Proteobacterium, and as such, closely related to Pseudomonas and Escherichia coli .
