= Zymobacter =

Scientific classification
- Domain: Bacteria
- Kingdom: Pseudomonadati
- Phylum: Pseudomonadota
- Class: Gammaproteobacteria
- Order: Oceanospirillales
- Family: Halomonadaceae
- Genus: Zymobacter; Okamoto et al. 1995

Species
- Z. palmae

Genus of bacteria

Zymobacter is a Gram-negative, facultatively anaerobic and non-spore-forming genus from the family of Halomonadaceae, with one known species (Zymobacter palmae). Zymobacter palmae has been isolated from palm sap from Okinawa Prefecture. Zymobacter palmae is notable for its ability to ferment ethanol.
