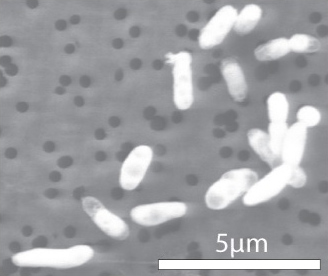
- GFAJ-1 grown on phosphorus.

Scientific classification
- Domain: Bacteria
- Kingdom: Pseudomonadati
- Phylum: Pseudomonadota
- Class: Gammaproteobacteria
- Order: Oceanospirillales
- Family: Halomonadaceae

Genera
- Aidingimonas; Carnimonas; Chromohalobacter; Cobetia; Deleya; Halomonas; Halotalea; Halovibrio; Kushneria; Modicisalibacter; Salicola; Salinicola; Volcaniella; Zymobacter

= Halomonadaceae =

Family of bacteria

Halomonadaceae is a family of halophilic Pseudomonadota.

== History ==
The family was originally described in 1988 to contain the genera Halomonas and Deleya.

In 1989, Chromobacterium marismortui was reclassified as Chromohalobacter marismortui forming a third genus in the family Halomonadaceae.

Subsequently, in 1990 a species was discovered and was originally proposed to be called Volcaniella eurihalina forming a new genus in the Halomonadaceae, but was later (in 1995) reclassified as a member of the genus Halomonas.

The species Carnimonas nigrificans (sole member of genus) was not placed in the family due to the lack of two out of 15 descriptive 16S rRNA signature sequences, but it has been proposed to reclassify it into the family.

In 1996, the family was later reorganised by unifying genera Deleya, Halomonas and Halovibrio and the species Paracoccus halodenitrificans into Halomonas and placing Zymobacter in this family. However, it was later discovered that the strain of Halovibrio variabilis DSM 3051 and DSM 3050 differed and the latter was made type strain of the Halovibrio, which remains still in use. and now comprising two species (the other being Halovibrio denitrificans)

In 2002, Halomonas marina was transferred to its own genus Cobetia, and in 2009 Halomonas marisflavi, Halomonas indalinina. and Halomonas avicenniae were transferred to a new genus called Kushneria (5 species)

Several singleton genera were created recently: in 2007, Halotalea alkalilenta was described, Aidingimonas halophila in 2009, Halospina denitrificans in 2006, Modicisalibacter tunisiensis in 2009 Salinicola socius in 2009. To the latter genus two species were transferred Halomonas salaria as Salinicola salarius and Chromohalobacter salarius as Salinicola halophilus.

The family also contain the recently discovered but uncultured bacterium "Candidatus Portiera aleyrodidarum" (primary endosymbionts of whiteflies).

== Genera ==
- Halomonas, the type genus
  - Halomonas elongata, the type species of the genus, however the longest known members of the family are Halomonas halodentrificans (1952), Chromohalobacter marismortui (1940) and Chromohalobacter beijerinckii (originally Pseudomonas beijerinckii).
  - Halomonas titanicae
- Aidingimonas halophila
- Cobetia
  - Cobetia marina, originally Pseudomonas marina, then Dalya marina, then Halomonas marina.
  - Cobetia crustatorum, isolated from fermented Korean seafood
- Carnimonas
- Chromohalobacter
  - Chromohalobacter marismortui
  - Chromohalobacter beijerinckii
  - Chromohalobacter canadensis and Chromohalobacter israelensis, formerly of the genus Halomonas
  - Chromohalobacter japonicus
  - Chromohalobacter nigrandesensis
  - Chromohalobacter salarius
  - Chromohalobacter salexigens
  - Chromohalobacter sarecensis, phychrotolerant
- Halotalea alkalilenta
- Kushneria
  - Kushneria aurantia, type species
  - Kushneria marisflavi, Kushneria indalinina and Kushneria avicenniae were previously classified under Halomonas
- Modicisalibacter
- Portiera
- Zymobacter, not to be confused with Zymomonas mobilis, an alphaproteobacterion studies for its biofuel production, an easy error that even the International Code of Nomenclature of Bacteria made in as noted in

Note: Species of Deleya and Halovibrio are now Halomonas

== Etymology ==
The names derives from Halomonas, which is the type genus of the family, plus the suffix -aceae, ending to denote a family

== Research ==
Geomicrobiologist Felisa Wolfe-Simon with a NASA funded team is researching a particular strain the family Halomonadaceae, named GFAJ-1, isolated and cultured from sediments collected along the shore of Mono Lake, near Yosemite National Park in eastern California. This GFAJ-1 strain of Halomonadaceae can grow in the presence of high concentrations of arsenic.

== See also ==
- Geomicrobiology
