= Endozoicomonas gorgoniicola =

Scientific classification
- Domain: Bacteria
- Kingdom: Pseudomonadati
- Phylum: Pseudomonadota
- Class: Gammaproteobacteria
- Order: Oceanospirillales
- Family: Endozoicomonadaceae
- Genus: Endozoicomonas
- Species: E. gorgoniicola

Binomial name
- Endozoicomonas gorgoniicola Pike, Haltli, and Kerr 2013

Type strain
- PS125

Species of bacterium

Endozoicomonas gorgoniicola is a Gram-negative and facultative anaerobic bacterium from the genus Endozoicomonas. Individual cells are motile and rod-shaped. Bacteria in this genus are symbionts of coral. E. gorgoniicola live specifically with soft coral (family Gorgoniidae) and were originally isolated from a species of Plexaura, an octocoral, off the coast of Bimini in the Bahamas. The presence of this bacterium in a coral microbiome is associated with coral health.

== Morphology ==
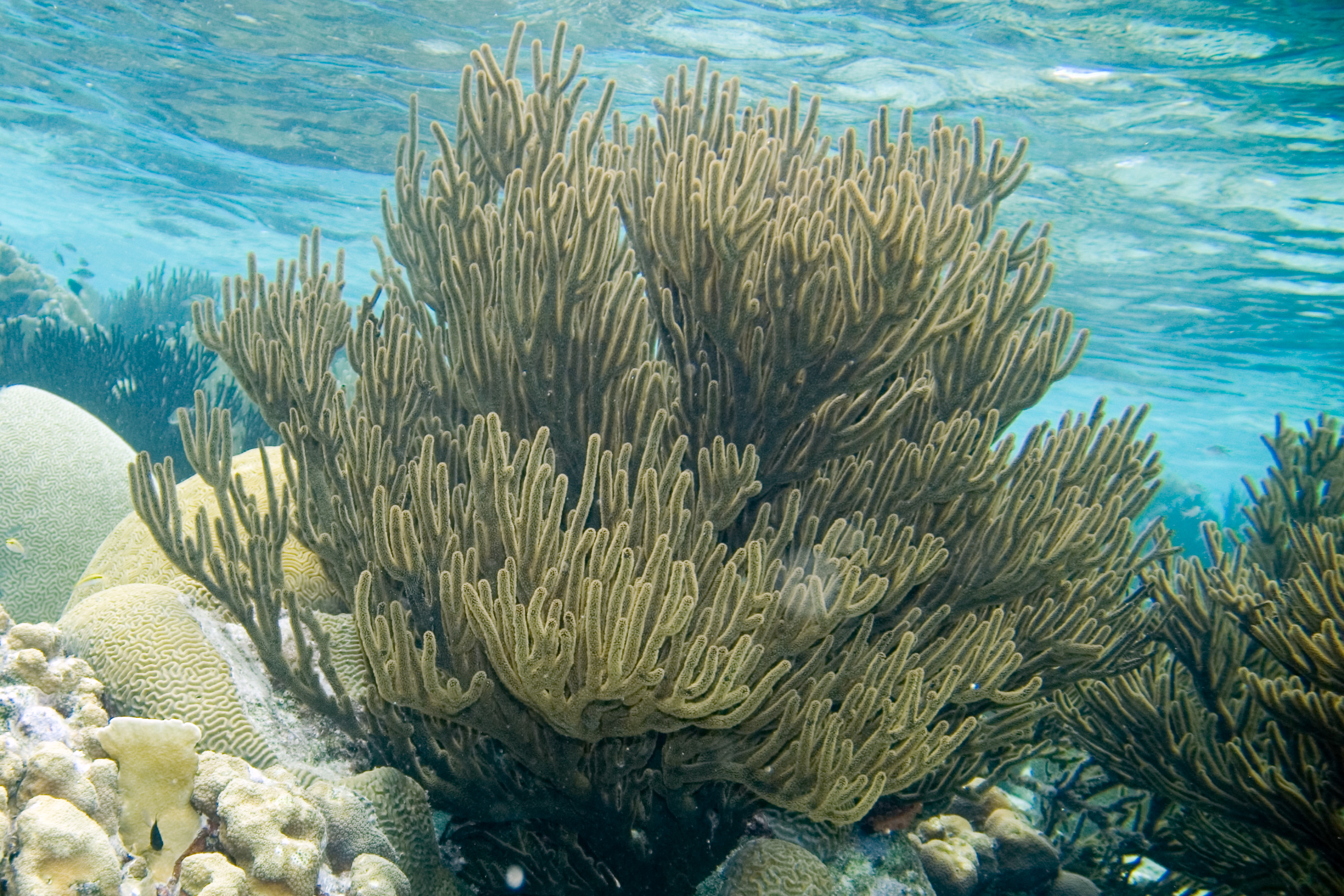
Black sea rod Plexaura homomalla (4675579531)

Endozoicomonas gorgoniicola is a gram-negative cell, characterized by the outer and inner membranes that enclose a thin layer of peptidoglycan. Cells are typically rod-shaped, and are about 1.7-2.5μm long (average 2.0μm) and 0.4-0.9μm in diameter (average 0.7μm). E. gorgoniicola possess flagella that allow for motility. When the bacterium is plated on marine agar, colonies form creamy white circles 0.5-1mm in diameter.

== Habitat ==
As with most microorganisms, E. gorgoniicola inhabits microhabitats along small scale abiotic gradients within a larger organism. This species is found in species of in the genus Plexaura, a rod shaped soft coral. Many Endozoicomonas species are found in multiple coral hosts, but E. gorgoniicola has only been isolated in Plexaura. Coral-associated bacteria inhabit the exoskeleton, in the tissues, and in mucus that covers the surface of coral polyps. The mucus layer is a unique and important feature of coral; it protects the polyp from unwanted pathogens and nutrients. Most of the anti-pathogenic properties of mucus come from bacteria, including Endozoicomonas species. The internal microhabitats of coral are also inhabited by endosymbiotic microalgal dinoflagellates in the family Symbiodiniaceae. Bacteria and these microalgal cells are harbored in the gastrodermis and form a symbiotic relationship by recycling nutrients.

== Metabolism ==
=== General ===
In the ocean, E. gorgoniicola can grow at a range of temperatures anywhere from 15-30°C. Cells will grow, albeit slowly, at salt concentrations above 4% and below 1%. As an endosymbiotic organism, E. gorgoniicola utilizes nutrients that the associated microalgal dinoflagellates produce from photosynthesis. E. gorgoniicola can use the photosynthate as an energy source, but more importantly, bacteria break down secondary compounds that the coral and microalgae produce as waste, such as dimethylsulfoniopropionate (DMSP). Without this symbiosis, toxic waste products would build up within the polyp.

=== Culture growth ===
Optimum growth of E. gorgoniicola occurs at 22-30 °C and pH 8.0. The salt content must be 2-3% NaCl, which is slightly lower than ocean salinity - seawater is generally 3.5% NaCl, or 35 parts per thousand. Growth occurs on marine agar 2216. In culture, E. gorgoniicola utilizes sugars such as lactose, maltose, D-mannose, and glycerol as a carbon source anaerobic respiration. It is a facultative aerobic organism and can switch to fermentation when oxygen is absent. These bacteria are not able to reduce nitrate, which is a function crucial to coral health; however, E. gorgoniicola contribute to the symbiosis through sulfate reduction.

== Genetics ==
The 16S rRNA regions of DNA from pure E. gorgoniicola colonies were sequenced and found to be novel strains of Endozoicomonas. DNA can be extracted from this species using the eubacterial 16S rRNA gene primers 27F (5'-AGAGTTTGATCCTGGCTCAG-3') and 1525R (5'AAGGAGGTGATCCAGCC-3'). It is closely related to the previously named E. elysicola, as well as E. montiporae and E. numazuensis. All are isolated from gorgonian (soft) corals. As of 2018, 1556 base pairs of rRNA have been sequenced from the E. gorgoniicola genome. The related species E. montiporae has a genome of about 5.4 million base pairs, and functions similarly to E. gorgoniicola, suggesting they may have a similar sized genome.
