= Amphritea spongicola =

Scientific classification
- Domain: Bacteria
- Kingdom: Pseudomonadati
- Phylum: Pseudomonadota
- Class: Gammaproteobacteria
- Order: Oceanospirillales
- Family: Oceanospirillaceae
- Genus: Amphritea
- Species: A. spongicola

Binomial name
- Amphritea spongicola Jang et al. 2015

Type strain
- MEBiC05461, JCM 16668, KCCM 42943

Species of bacterium

Amphritea spongicola is a Gram-negative and rod-shaped bacterium from the genus of Amphritea which has been isolated from a marine sponge from Micronesia.
