= Neptunomonas japonica =

Scientific classification
- Domain: Bacteria
- Kingdom: Pseudomonadati
- Phylum: Pseudomonadota
- Class: Gammaproteobacteria
- Order: Oceanospirillales
- Family: Oceanospirillaceae
- Genus: Neptunomonas
- Species: N. japonica

Binomial name
- Neptunomonas japonica Miyazaki et al. 2008

Species of bacterium

Neptunomonas japonica is a species of bacteria. It is Gram-negative, rod-shaped, non-spore-forming and motile by means of a single polar or subterminal flagellum. Its type strain is JAMM 0745T (=JCM 14595^{T}=DSM 18939^{T}). It was first found in carcasses of a Sperm whale and is closely related to a symbiotic bacterial clone of the polychaete Osedax japonicus.
