= Amphritea japonica =

Scientific classification
- Domain: Bacteria
- Kingdom: Pseudomonadati
- Phylum: Pseudomonadota
- Class: Gammaproteobacteria
- Order: Oceanospirillales
- Family: Oceanospirillaceae
- Genus: Amphritea
- Species: A. japonica

Binomial name
- Amphritea japonica Miyazaki et al. 2008

Type strain
- ATCC BAA-1530, JAMM 1866, JCM 14782

Species of bacterium

Amphritea japonica is a Gram-negative, rod-shaped, non-spore-forming and motile bacterium from the genus Amphritea which has been isolated from sediments near a sperm whale carcasses from Kagoshima on Japan.
