= Neptuniibacter halophilus =

Scientific classification
- Domain: Bacteria
- Kingdom: Pseudomonadati
- Phylum: Pseudomonadota
- Class: Gammaproteobacteria
- Order: Oceanospirillales
- Family: Oceanospirillaceae
- Genus: Neptuniibacter
- Species: N. halophilus

Binomial name
- Neptuniibacter halophilus Chen et al. 2012

Type strain
- BCRC 80079, Chen Antisso-13, LMG 25378

Species of bacterium

Neptuniibacter halophilus is a Gram-negative, aerobic, rod-shaped and motile bacterium from the genus of Neptuniibacter which has been isolated from a salt pan in Taiwan.
