= Litoribacillus peritrichatus =

Scientific classification
- Domain: Bacteria
- Kingdom: Pseudomonadati
- Phylum: Pseudomonadota
- Class: Gammaproteobacteria
- Order: Oceanospirillales
- Family: Oceanospirillaceae
- Genus: Litoribacillus
- Species: L. peritrichatus

Binomial name
- Litoribacillus peritrichatus Zhao et al. 2014

Type strain
- CGMCC 1.10796, JCM 17551, JYr12

Species of bacterium

Litoribacillus peritrichatus is a Gram-negative, strictly aerobic, short rod-shaped and motile bacterium from the genus of Litoribacillus with peritrichous flagella which has been isolated from coastal sediments from the Yellow Sea near Qingdao in China.
