= Marinospirillum minutulum =

Scientific classification
- Domain: Bacteria
- Kingdom: Pseudomonadati
- Phylum: Pseudomonadota
- Class: Gammaproteobacteria
- Order: Oceanospirillales
- Family: Oceanospirillaceae
- Genus: Marinospirillum
- Species: M. minutulum

Binomial name
- Marinospirillum minutulum (Watanabe 1959) Satomi et al. 1998

Type strain
- ATCC 19193, CGMCC 1.2716, CIP 103376, DSM 6287, IFO 15450, LMG 5334, NBRC 15450, NCIMB 1347, NCMB 1347, VPI 40

Synonyms
- Spirillum minutulum Oceanospirillum minutulum

Species of bacterium

Marinospirillum minutulum is a helical, halophilic and Gram-negative bacterium from the genus Marinospirillum.
