= Spongiispira norvegica =

Scientific classification
- Domain: Bacteria
- Kingdom: Pseudomonadati
- Phylum: Pseudomonadota
- Class: Gammaproteobacteria
- Order: Oceanospirillales
- Family: Oceanospirillaceae
- Genus: Spongiispira
- Species: S. norvegica

Binomial name
- Spongiispira norvegica Kaesler et al. 2008

Type strain
- DSM 17749, Gp_4_7.1 T, NCIMB 14401

Species of bacterium

Spongiispira norvegica is a Gram-negative, aerobic and motile bacterium from the genus of Spongiispira which has been isolated from the sponge Isops phlegraei from the Sula Ridge from the coast of Norway.
