= Neptuniibacter marinus =

Scientific classification
- Domain: Bacteria
- Kingdom: Pseudomonadati
- Phylum: Pseudomonadota
- Class: Gammaproteobacteria
- Order: Oceanospirillales
- Family: Oceanospirillaceae
- Genus: Neptuniibacter
- Species: N. marinus

Binomial name
- Neptuniibacter marinus Diéguez et al. 2017

Type strain
- CECT 8938, DSM 100783, ATR 1.1, ATR 1.2

Species of bacterium

Neptuniibacter marinus is a Gram-negative, aerobic and motile bacterium from the genus of Neptuniibacter which has been isolated from the scallop Pecten maximus.
