= Marinospirillum insulare =

Scientific classification
- Domain: Bacteria
- Kingdom: Pseudomonadati
- Phylum: Pseudomonadota
- Class: Gammaproteobacteria
- Order: Oceanospirillales
- Family: Oceanospirillaceae
- Genus: Marinospirillum
- Species: M. insulare

Binomial name
- Marinospirillum insulare Satomi et al. 2004

Type strain
- LMG 21802, NBRC 100033, Satomi K

Species of bacterium

Marinospirillum insulare is a helical, Gram-negative and halophilic bacterium from the genus Marinospirillum which has been isolated from fermented fish brine from the Niijima Island on Japan.
