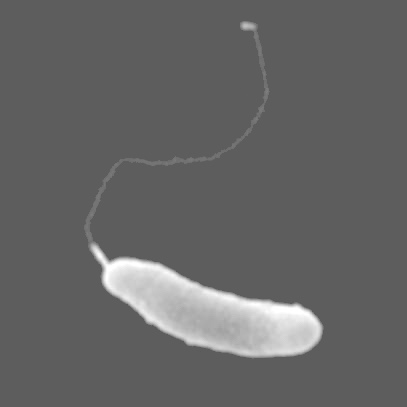

Scientific classification
- Domain: Bacteria
- Kingdom: Pseudomonadati
- Phylum: Pseudomonadota
- Class: Gammaproteobacteria
- Order: Oceanospirillales
- Family: Oceanospirillaceae
- Genus: Marinomonas
- Species: M. arctica

Binomial name
- Marinomonas arctica Zhang et al. 2008

Type strain
- CGMCC 1.6498, JCM 14976, BSi20328, strain 328

= Marinomonas arctica =

Species of bacterium

Marinomonas arctica is a Gram-negative, psychrotolerant and motile bacterium from the genus of Marinomonas which has been isolated from sea-ice from the Canadian Basin from the Arctic Ocean.
