= Marinomonas pontica =

Scientific classification
- Domain: Bacteria
- Kingdom: Pseudomonadati
- Phylum: Pseudomonadota
- Class: Gammaproteobacteria
- Order: Oceanospirillales
- Family: Oceanospirillaceae
- Genus: Marinomonas
- Species: M. pontica

Binomial name
- Marinomonas pontica Ivanova et al. 2005

Type strain
- 46-16, DSM 17793, KMM 3492, LMG 22531, UCM 11075

Synonyms
- Marinomonas pontii

Species of bacterium

Marinomonas pontica is a Gram-negative bacterium from the genus of Marinomonas which has been isolated from sea water from the Black Sea in Ukraine.
