= Bacterioplanoides pacificum =

Scientific classification
- Domain: Bacteria
- Kingdom: Pseudomonadati
- Phylum: Pseudomonadota
- Class: Gammaproteobacteria
- Order: Oceanospirillales
- Family: Oceanospirillaceae
- Genus: Bacterioplanoides
- Species: B. pacificum

Binomial name
- Bacterioplanoides pacificum Wang et al. 2016

Species of bacterium

Bacterioplanoides pacificum is a Gram-negative, strictly aerobic and motile bacterium from the genus of Bacterioplanoides with a single polar flagellum which has been isolated from the South Pacific Gyre.
