= Amphritea ceti =

Scientific classification
- Domain: Bacteria
- Kingdom: Pseudomonadati
- Phylum: Pseudomonadota
- Class: Gammaproteobacteria
- Order: Oceanospirillales
- Family: Oceanospirillaceae
- Genus: Amphritea
- Species: A. ceti

Binomial name
- Amphritea ceti Kim et al. 2014

Type strain
- RA1, KCTC 42154, NBRC 110551

Species of bacterium

Amphritea ceti is a Gram-negative, aerobic, rod-shaped and non-spore-forming bacterium from the genus Amphritea which has been isolated from the faeces from a Beluga whale from the Yeosu aquarium on Korea.
