= Bacterioplanes sanyensis =

Scientific classification
- Domain: Bacteria
- Kingdom: Pseudomonadati
- Phylum: Pseudomonadota
- Class: Gammaproteobacteria
- Order: Oceanospirillales
- Family: Oceanospirillaceae
- Genus: Bacterioplanes
- Species: B. sanyensis

Binomial name
- Bacterioplanes sanyensis Wang et al. 2016

Type strain
- CGMCC 1.12392, KCTC 32220, GYP-2

Species of bacterium

Bacterioplanes sanyensis is a Gram-negative bacterium from the genus of Bacterioplanes which has been isolated from a pool with cyanobacteria Spirulina platensis in Sanya in China.
