= Marinospirillum celere =

Scientific classification
- Domain: Bacteria
- Kingdom: Pseudomonadati
- Phylum: Pseudomonadota
- Class: Gammaproteobacteria
- Order: Oceanospirillales
- Family: Oceanospirillaceae
- Genus: Marinospirillum
- Species: M. celere

Binomial name
- Marinospirillum celere Namsaraev et al. 2009

Type strain
- DSM 18438, LMG 24610, v1c_Sn-red, VKM 2416, VKM B-241

Species of bacterium

Marinospirillum celere is a helical, haloalkaliphilic and Gram-negative bacterium from the genus Marinospirillum which has been isolated from sediments from the Mono Lake in the United States.
