= Marinomonas polaris =

Scientific classification
- Domain: Bacteria
- Kingdom: Pseudomonadati
- Phylum: Pseudomonadota
- Class: Gammaproteobacteria
- Order: Oceanospirillales
- Family: Oceanospirillaceae
- Genus: Marinomonas
- Species: M. polaris

Binomial name
- Marinomonas polaris Gupta et al. 2006

Type strain
- CIP 109165, CK13, DSM 16579, JCM 12522, MTCC 6645

Species of bacterium

Marinomonas polaris is a psychrohalotolerant, aerobic and motile bacterium from the genus of Marinomonas which has been isolated from coastal sea water from the Kerguelen Islands.
