= Balneatrix alpica =

Scientific classification
- Domain: Bacteria
- Kingdom: Pseudomonadati
- Phylum: Pseudomonadota
- Class: Gammaproteobacteria
- Order: Oceanospirillales
- Family: Oceanospirillaceae
- Genus: Balneatrix
- Species: B. alpica

Binomial name
- Balneatrix alpica Dauga et al. 1993

Type strain
- 4-87, ATCC 51285, CCUG 32555, CIP 103589, CIP 103589.4-87, DSM 16621

Species of bacterium

Balneatrix alpica is a bacterium from the genus of Balneatrix which is associated with pneumonia and meningitis in rare cases.
