= Marinomonas blandensis =

Scientific classification
- Domain: Bacteria
- Kingdom: Pseudomonadati
- Phylum: Pseudomonadota
- Class: Gammaproteobacteria
- Order: Oceanospirillales
- Family: Oceanospirillaceae
- Genus: Marinomonas
- Species: M. blandensis

Binomial name
- Marinomonas blandensis Arahal et al. 2016

Type strain
- CECT 7076, LMG 29722, MED121

Species of bacterium

Marinomonas blandensis is a Gram-negative, strictly aerobic, moderately halophilic and chemoorganotrophic bacterium from the genus of Marinomonas which has been isolated from seawater from the Blanes Bay Microbial Observatory from the Mediterranean Sea.
