= Marinomonas primoryensis =

Scientific classification
- Domain: Bacteria
- Kingdom: Pseudomonadati
- Phylum: Pseudomonadota
- Class: Gammaproteobacteria
- Order: Oceanospirillales
- Family: Oceanospirillaceae
- Genus: Marinomonas
- Species: M. primoryensis

Binomial name
- Marinomonas primoryensis Romanenko et al. 2003

Type strain
- JCM 11775, KMM 3633, NBRC 103029, NRIC 523

Species of bacterium

Marinomonas primoryensis is a Gram-negative, aerobic, psychrophilic, halophilic and motile bacterium from the genus of Marinomonas which has been isolated from coastal sea ice.
