= Nitrincola alkalisediminis =

Scientific classification
- Domain: Bacteria
- Kingdom: Pseudomonadati
- Phylum: Pseudomonadota
- Class: Gammaproteobacteria
- Order: Oceanospirillales
- Family: Oceanospirillaceae
- Genus: Nitrincola
- Species: N. alkalisediminis

Binomial name
- Nitrincola alkalisediminis Joshi et al. 2016

Type strain
- JCM 19317, KCTC 42948, MEB087, MEB142

Species of bacterium

Nitrincola alkalisediminis is a Gram-negative, aerobic and alkaliphilic bacterium from the genus of Nitrincola which has been isolated from the Lonar Lake in India.
