= Neptunomonas acidivorans =

Scientific classification
- Domain: Bacteria
- Kingdom: Pseudomonadati
- Phylum: Pseudomonadota
- Class: Gammaproteobacteria
- Order: Oceanospirillales
- Family: Oceanospirillaceae
- Genus: Neptunomonas
- Species: N. acidivorans

Binomial name
- Neptunomonas acidivorans Yang et al. 2014

Type strain
- JCM 18291, KCCM 42975, MEBiC06243

Species of bacterium

Neptunomonas acidivorans is a Gram-negative, aerobic, rod-shaped and motile bacterium from the genus of Neptunomonas which has been isolated from sediment from the Daebu Island.
