= Marinomonas balearica =

Scientific classification
- Domain: Bacteria
- Kingdom: Pseudomonadati
- Phylum: Pseudomonadota
- Class: Gammaproteobacteria
- Order: Oceanospirillales
- Family: Oceanospirillaceae
- Genus: Marinomonas
- Species: M. balearica

Binomial name
- Marinomonas balearica Espinosa et al. 2010

Type strain
- CECT 7378, IVIA-Po-101, NCIMB 14432

Species of bacterium

Marinomonas balearica is a Gram-negative and aerobic bacterium from the genus of Marinomonas which has been isolated from seagrass Posidonia oceanica.
