= Marinomonas communis =

Scientific classification
- Domain: Bacteria
- Kingdom: Pseudomonadati
- Phylum: Pseudomonadota
- Class: Gammaproteobacteria
- Order: Oceanospirillales
- Family: Oceanospirillaceae
- Genus: Marinomonas
- Species: M. communis

Binomial name
- Marinomonas communis (Baumann et al. 1972) van Landschoot and De Ley 1984

Type strain
- ATCC 27118, Baumann 8, CCUG 16012, CDC 9358-7B, CECT 5003, CIP 74.01, CIP 74.1, CIP 74.1T, DSM 5604, IAM 12914, JCM 20766, LMG 2864, NBRC 102224, NCIB 1961, NCIMB 1961, NCMB 1961

Synonyms
- Alteromonas communis Marinomonas basaltis Oceanospirillum commune

Species of bacterium

Marinomonas communis is a Gram-negative and aerobic bacterium from the genus of Marinomonas which has been isolated from surface seawater from Hawaii.
