= Marinomonas arenicola =

Scientific classification
- Domain: Bacteria
- Kingdom: Pseudomonadati
- Phylum: Pseudomonadota
- Class: Gammaproteobacteria
- Order: Oceanospirillales
- Family: Oceanospirillaceae
- Genus: Marinomonas
- Species: M. arenicola

Binomial name
- Marinomonas arenicola Romanenko et al. 2009

Type strain
- JCM 15737, KMM 3893, NRIC 0752

Species of bacterium

Marinomonas arenicola is a bacterium from the genus of Marinomonas which has been isolated from sediments of the Sea of Japan.
