= Amphritea atlantica =

Scientific classification
- Domain: Bacteria
- Kingdom: Pseudomonadati
- Phylum: Pseudomonadota
- Class: Gammaproteobacteria
- Order: Oceanospirillales
- Family: Oceanospirillaceae
- Genus: Amphritea
- Species: A. atlantica

Binomial name
- Amphritea atlantica Gärtner et al. 2008

Type strain
- DSM 18887, LMG 24143, M41

Species of bacterium

Amphritea atlantica is a gram-negative, aerobic, rod-shaped and motile bacterium from the genus Amphritea which has been isolated from the mussel Bathymodiolus from the Logatchev hydrothermal vent field.
