= Marinomonas ostreistagni =

Scientific classification
- Domain: Bacteria
- Kingdom: Pseudomonadati
- Phylum: Pseudomonadota
- Class: Gammaproteobacteria
- Order: Oceanospirillales
- Family: Oceanospirillaceae
- Genus: Marinomonas
- Species: M. ostreistagni

Binomial name
- Marinomonas ostreistagni Lau et al. 2006

Type strain
- JCM 13672, NRRL B-41433, UST 010306-043

Synonyms
- Marinomonas sanya

Species of bacterium

Marinomonas ostreistagni is a Gram-negative, aerobic, rod-shaped, halophilic and neutrophilic bacterium from the genus of Marinomonas which has been isolated from a pond which was cultivated with pearl oyster in Sanya in China.
