= Marinospirillum megaterium =

Scientific classification
- Domain: Bacteria
- Kingdom: Pseudomonadati
- Phylum: Pseudomonadota
- Class: Gammaproteobacteria
- Order: Oceanospirillales
- Family: Oceanospirillaceae
- Genus: Marinospirillum
- Species: M. megaterium

Binomial name
- Marinospirillum megaterium Satomi et al. 1998

Type strain
- CIP 106459, JCM 10129, strain H7

Species of bacterium

Marinospirillum megaterium is a helical, halophilic and Gram-negative bacterium from the genus Marinospirillum which has been isolated from fermented brine.
