= Marinomonas ushuaiensis =

Scientific classification
- Domain: Bacteria
- Kingdom: Pseudomonadati
- Phylum: Pseudomonadota
- Class: Gammaproteobacteria
- Order: Oceanospirillales
- Family: Oceanospirillaceae
- Genus: Marinomonas
- Species: M. ushuaiensis

Binomial name
- Marinomonas ushuaiensis Prabagaran et al. 2005

Type strain
- CIP 108668, DSM 15871, JCM 12170, MTCC 6143, U1

Synonyms
- Marinomonas alkaliphila

Species of bacterium

Marinomonas ushuaiensis is a Gram-negative, psychrophilic, rod-shaped, non-spore-forming and motile bacterium from the genus of Marinomonas which has been isolated from coastal sea water from Ushuaia in Argentina.
