= Nitrincola nitratireducens =

Scientific classification
- Domain: Bacteria
- Kingdom: Pseudomonadati
- Phylum: Pseudomonadota
- Class: Gammaproteobacteria
- Order: Oceanospirillales
- Family: Oceanospirillaceae
- Genus: Nitrincola
- Species: N. nitratireducens

Binomial name
- Nitrincola nitratireducens Singh et al. 2015

Type strain
- JCM 18788, MTCC 11628, AK23, AK28

Species of bacterium

Nitrincola nitratireducens is a gram-negative, rod-shaped and motile bacterium from the genus of Nitrincola which has been isolated from sediments from the Lonar Lake in India.
