= Marinomonas pollencensis =

Scientific classification
- Domain: Bacteria
- Kingdom: Pseudomonadati
- Phylum: Pseudomonadota
- Class: Gammaproteobacteria
- Order: Oceanospirillales
- Family: Oceanospirillaceae
- Genus: Marinomonas
- Species: M. pollencensis

Binomial name
- Marinomonas pollencensis Espinosa et al. 2010

Type strain
- CECT 7375, IVIA-Po-185, NCIMB 14435

Species of bacterium

Marinomonas pollencensis is a Gram-negative and aerobic bacterium from the genus of Marinomonas which has been isolated from the seagrass Posidonia oceanica.
