= Marinomonas gallaica =

Scientific classification
- Domain: Bacteria
- Kingdom: Pseudomonadati
- Phylum: Pseudomonadota
- Class: Gammaproteobacteria
- Order: Oceanospirillales
- Family: Oceanospirillaceae
- Genus: Marinomonas
- Species: M. gallaica

Binomial name
- Marinomonas gallaica Lasa et al. 2016

Type strain
- CECT 9049, LMG 29243, Cmf 17.2, Rd 20.33

Species of bacterium

Marinomonas gallaica is a Gram-negative bacterium from the genus of Marinomonas which has been isolated from the clam species Ruditapes decussatus.
