= Oleispira antarctica =

Scientific classification
- Domain: Bacteria
- Kingdom: Pseudomonadati
- Phylum: Pseudomonadota
- Class: Gammaproteobacteria
- Order: Oceanospirillales
- Family: Oceanospirillaceae
- Genus: Oleispira
- Species: O. antarctica

Binomial name
- Oleispira antarctica Yakimov et al. 2003

Species of bacterium

Oleispira antarctica is a hydrocarbonoclastic marine bacterium, the type species in its genus. It is psychrophilic, aerobic and Gram-negative, with polar flagellum. Its genome has been sequenced and from this information, it has been recognized as a potentially important organism capable of oil degradation in the deep sea.

== Etymology ==
Oleispira antarctica, "oleum" meaning oil, "spira" meaning a spire (in other words, coiled or twisted) for a combined meaning of a spiral-shaped, oil-degrading organism from Antarctica.

== Phylogeny ==
Based on sequencing of 16S ribosomal RNA genes conducted by Yakimov et al., phylogenetically, this organism is related most closely to species of Oceanobacter, Marinobacterium, and Marinomonas. It belongs to the class Gammaproteobacteria and had its own phyletic line within the class. Its 16S rRNA gene sequences were no more than 90% similar to any other Gammaproteobacteria 16S rRNA gene sequence, and thus represented a novel species within a new genus. O. antarctica was the first species in the new genus, but another new species, Oleispira lenta, was characterized 9 years later. Sequencing of O. lenta's 16S ribosomal RNA genes revealed sequence similarity of about 97.2% to O. antarctica.

== Isolation ==
Oleispira antarctica was isolated and characterized from shallow samples of sea water collected from the inlet portion of Rod Bay in the Ross Sea (74°41.753'S, 164°07.188'E) during an expedition from the summer season in Antarctica of 1999 to the same time in the year 2000 by Yakimov et al. The investigators performed enrichment and incubation of collected samples in 20 ml volumes of crude oil and additional nutrients. After 2 months of enrichment at 4 °C, cultures were diluted in tubes containing solutions of mineral medium of type ONR7a that were additionally supplemented with more crude light oil. These tube cultures were then incubated in darkness until turbidity (which was used to indicate bacterial growth changes over some period of time) became high enough to indicate saturated growth samples (which took approximately 2 months). These cultures were then diluted and the most diluted cultures (10^{−4}) with positive growth were plated on solid form ONR7a mineral medium that also contained tetradecane (a 14 carbon hydrocarbon). After 15 days and further incubation at 4 °C, the investigators retrieved individual colonies.

== Morphology ==
The species has a Gram-negative cell wall. It exists as a curved rod to spiraled cell shape with dimensions 2-5 μm by 0.4-0.8 μm. It is mobile with a long, helical-structured polar flagellum > 5 μm in length. One morphologically distinct characteristic is a unique drumstick-like enlargement and congealing of one or both ends of the cell where the cell wall is more electron-dense.

== Growth, Genomics, and Metabolism ==
=== Growth and Genomics ===
Colonies appeared uncolored, a little translucent and opaque, or a little bit yellow, on ONR7a plates additionally containing tetradecane. The organism grows best at 1-25 °C with optimal growth temperature at 2-4 °C, making it a psychrophile. It is a stenohaline organism, meaning it grows in only a narrow range of salinity, requires sodium ions for growth, and grows best in presence of 3-5% sodium chloride. Oxidase and catalase enzymes were present. Its principle fatty acids are monounsaturated, with principle fatty acids being C18:1, C16:1, and C16:0. Strains of the species could synthesize polyunsaturated eicosapentaenoic acid at low temperatures. It has a GC-content of 41-42% and the size of its genome is about 2 Mbp. There are 3919 protein coding genes present. There were no plasmids found.

=== Metabolism ===
Oleispira antarctica performs aerobic respiration, but can also grow under anaerobic conditions by performing reduction of nitrate. Ammonia and nitrate may serve as nitrogen sources in this case. It is a chemoorganoheterotroph with a small range of substrates that facilitate its growth. This small range includes primarily aliphatic carbon molecules, Tweens (derivatives of fatty acid esters of sorbitan), and volatilized fatty acids. This species also lacks the ability to hydrolyze or metabolize starch, casein, lecithin, alginate or agar. Rarely did this species take up or use either commonly-utilized carbohydrates (e.g. glucose) or amino acids (e.g. glutamine) for its metabolism.

== Importance and Application ==
Oleispira antarctica, in addition to a few other species, has recently received increasing consideration and attention for potential application in microbe-based bioremediation. Specifically, O. antarctica could potentially be used in the clean up of marine environments damaged or contaminated by hydrocarbon pollution, especially in the context of oil spills.

16S ribosomal RNA gene clones identified as belonging to the genus Oleispira were found to be very commonly occurring in samples obtained from deep underwater depths at the Deepwater Horizon oil spill in 2010. Oleispira antarctica in particular is a cold marine dwelling species so this species could be applied as part of a bioremediation toolbox of organisms that can work to degrade petroleum hydrocarbons pollutants at, for example, different temperature ranges in different environments.
