= Marinomonas brasilensis =

Scientific classification
- Domain: Bacteria
- Kingdom: Pseudomonadati
- Phylum: Pseudomonadota
- Class: Gammaproteobacteria
- Order: Oceanospirillales
- Family: Oceanospirillaceae
- Genus: Marinomonas
- Species: M. brasilensis

Binomial name
- Marinomonas brasilensis Chimetto et al. 2011

Type strain
- CAIM 1459, LMG 25434, R-278, R-40503

Synonyms
- Marinomonas brasiliensis

Species of bacterium

Marinomonas brasilensis is a Gram-negative and aerobic bacterium from the genus of Marinomonas which has been isolated from the coral Mussismilia hispida from the São Sebastião Channel in Brazil.
