= Marinomonas vaga =

Scientific classification
- Domain: Bacteria
- Kingdom: Pseudomonadati
- Phylum: Pseudomonadota
- Class: Gammaproteobacteria
- Order: Oceanospirillales
- Family: Oceanospirillaceae
- Genus: Marinomonas
- Species: M. vaga

Binomial name
- Marinomonas vaga (Baumann et al. 1972) van Landschoot and De Ley 1984

Type strain
- 40, ATCC 27119, CCUG 16047, CECT 5004, CIP 103202, CIP 103202= DSM 5605 = LMG 2845, CIP 74.02, DSM 5605, IAM 12923, JCM 20774, LMG 2845, NBRC 103030, NCIB 1962, NCIMB 1962, NCMB 1962

Synonyms
- Alteromonas vaga Oceanospirillum vagum

Species of bacterium

Marinomonas vaga is a bacterium from the genus of Marinomonas which has been isolated from seawater from Hawaii.
