= Marinospirillum alkaliphilum =

Scientific classification
- Domain: Bacteria
- Kingdom: Pseudomonadati
- Phylum: Pseudomonadota
- Class: Gammaproteobacteria
- Order: Oceanospirillales
- Family: Oceanospirillaceae
- Genus: Marinospirillum
- Species: M. alkaliphilum

Binomial name
- Marinospirillum alkaliphilum Zhang et al. 2002

Type strain
- AS 1.2746, CGMCC 1.2746, CGMCC AS 1.2746, JCM 11312, Z4

Species of bacterium

Marinospirillum alkaliphilum is an alkaliphilic and Gram-negative bacterium from the genus Marinospirillum which has been isolated from the Haoji soda lake in China.
