= Neptunomonas phycophila =

Scientific classification
- Domain: Bacteria
- Kingdom: Pseudomonadati
- Phylum: Pseudomonadota
- Class: Gammaproteobacteria
- Order: Oceanospirillales
- Family: Oceanospirillaceae
- Genus: Neptunomonas
- Species: N. phycophila

Binomial name
- Neptunomonas phycophila Frommlet et al. 2015

Type strain
- CECT 8716, LMG 28329, SYM1

Species of bacterium

Neptunomonas phycophila is a Gram-negative, anaerobic and rod-shaped bacterium from the genus of Neptunomonas which has been isolated from the eukaryota Symbiodinium from Puerto Rico.
