= Marinomonas aquimarina =

Scientific classification
- Domain: Bacteria
- Kingdom: Pseudomonadati
- Phylum: Pseudomonadota
- Class: Gammaproteobacteria
- Order: Oceanospirillales
- Family: Oceanospirillaceae
- Genus: Marinomonas
- Species: M. aquimarina

Binomial name
- Marinomonas aquimarina Macián et al. 2005

Type strain
- 11SM4, CCUG 49439, CECT 5080, CIP 108405, LMG 25236

Synonyms
- Marinomonas aquamarina

Species of bacterium

Marinomonas aquimarina is a bacterium from the genus of Marinomonas which has been isolated from oysters and seawater.
