= Endozoicomonas euniceicola =

Scientific classification
- Domain: Bacteria
- Kingdom: Pseudomonadati
- Phylum: Pseudomonadota
- Class: Gammaproteobacteria
- Order: Oceanospirillales
- Family: Endozoicomonadaceae
- Genus: Endozoicomonas
- Species: E. euniceicola

Binomial name
- Endozoicomonas euniceicola Pike et al. 2013

Type strain
- DSM 26535, EF212, NCCB 100458

Synonyms
- Endozoicomonas eunicicola

Species of bacterium

Endozoicomonas euniceicola is a Gram-negative, facultatively anaerobic and rod-shaped bacterium from the genus Endozoicomonas which has been isolated from the octocorals Eunicea fusca and Plexaura.
