= Marinomonas fungiae =

Scientific classification
- Domain: Bacteria
- Kingdom: Pseudomonadati
- Phylum: Pseudomonadota
- Class: Gammaproteobacteria
- Order: Oceanospirillales
- Family: Oceanospirillaceae
- Genus: Marinomonas
- Species: M. fungiae

Binomial name
- Marinomonas fungiae Kumari et al. 2014

Type strain
- AN44, JCM 18476, LMG 27065

Synonyms
- Marinomonas scutaria

Species of bacterium

Marinomonas fungiae is a Gram-negative, aerobic, rod-shaped and motile bacterium from the genus of Marinomonas which has been isolated from the coral Ctenactis echinata from the Andaman Sea.
