= Endozoicomonas =

Scientific classification
- Domain: Bacteria
- Kingdom: Pseudomonadati
- Phylum: Pseudomonadota
- Class: Gammaproteobacteria
- Order: Oceanospirillales
- Family: Endozoicomonadaceae
- Genus: Endozoicomonas; Kurahashi and Yokota 2007

Type species
- Endozoicomonas elysicola

Species
- E. acroporae E. arenosclerae E. ascidiicola E. atrinae E. coralli E. elysicola E. euniceicola E. gorgoniicola E. montiporae E. numazuensis

Synonyms
- Elysiobacter; Endozoicimonas

Genus of bacteria

Endozoicomonas is a genus of Gram-negative, aerobic or facultatively anaerobic, chemoorganotrophic, rod-shaped, marine bacteria from the family Endozoicomonadaceae. Endozoicomonas are symbionts of marine animals.

== Scientific history ==
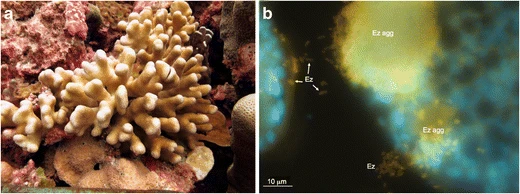
A coral and Endozoicomonas bacteria

The genus was firstly proposed in 2007 after isolating an unknown Gammaproteobacteria from the sea slug Elysia ornata. Called E. numazuensis, it was the first of many diverse species now known, and was collected from seawater off the coast of Izu-Miyake Island, Japan, at a depth of 15 m. Many new species have been identified after this:

- In 2010, researchers from different Asian universities isolated E. montiporae from the encrustating pores of coral species Montipora aequituberculata, in Taiwan, and a scientific team of the University of Queensland, Australia, discovered many unidentified Gammaproteobacteria symbionts were closely related to Endozoicomonas as well during that same year.
- More or less in the same period E. arenosclerae was isolated from the endemic marine sponge of Rio de Janeiro Arenosclera brasiliensis and, both E.eunicecola and E.gorgoniicola were isolated from the octocorals Eunicea fusca and Plexaura species respectively.
- The first Endozoicomonas sequenced sample was E. elysicola, in 2013, being part of a project that focused on sequencing different strains of unknown microorganism at the time, and in 2014, its genome was updated and published together with the before unknown genomic sequences of E. montiporae and E. numazuensis. Then, E. atrinae was isolated from the intestine of the bivalve Atrina pectinata in 2014 as well.
- After 2014, other species isolated and acknowledged were E. acroporae and E. ascidiicola, the first one from a coral of the genus Acropora in Southern Taiwan and the latter from member of genus Ascidiacea.

At the moment, 11 species are validly published under the ICNP, with the remaining four being Candidatus.

== Biology and biochemistry ==
=== Genome ===
Despite the abundance of Endozoicomonas symbionts, only three complete Endozoicomonas genomes are publicly available (E. elysicola, E. montiporae, and E. numazuensis), isolated from a sea slug, coral, and a sponge, respectively. For their sequencing analyses, culture-independent methods of genome sequencing were used, including meta-genomic binning and single cell genomics. Endozoicomonas species have large genomes ranging from 4.049 Mb (Endozoicomonas sp. AB1) to 6.69 Mb (E. elysicola DSM22380).

=== Metabolism ===
Research led to the discovery that its genome is enriched with genes associated with transporter activity of carbon sugars, as well as cell secretion and transposase activity, suggesting that these organisms have a potential role in the up-cycling of carbohydrates or the supply of proteins to their host. These skills can help them to quickly adapt to a new host or take advantage of a new niche. Although none of the Endozoicomonas genomes have genes for fixing nitrogen directly, some species have several forms of nitrate reductase, accounting for the conversion of nitrate to nitrite and of nitrite to ammonia, which could then be secreted. Endozoicomonas contain in their own genome for the assimilation of ammonia through the synthesis of glutamine and glutamate. They can also synthesize other amino acids like alanine, aspartate, cysteine, glycine, homocysteine, homoserine, leucine, lysine, methionine, serine, and threonine, indicating strain-specific functions.

The Endozoicomonas genus also plays an important role in the coral sulfur cycle. E. acroporae strains cannot only metabolize dimethylsulfoniopropionate (DMSP) to produce dimethylsulfide (DMS), but also use DMSP as a carbon source for growth and survival. Through several research done, the first DMSP-related operon in E. acroporae was also identified, which links DMSP metabolism to the central carbon cycle.

A high metabolic specificity is shown by Endozoicomonas samples isolated from the intertidal marine sponge O. papilla. Indeed, the presence of gene clusters encoding for the lactate, L-rhamnose metabolism, and phenylacetic acid (PA) degradation pathway indicates the probable ability of these microorganisms to utilize alternative carbon sources.

== Ecology ==
=== Habitat ===
Endozoicomonas are mutualistic organisms that have a symbiotic relationship with many marine animals. Found in all oceans of the world, they inhabit mostly in warm and mildly temperate waters located between the tropics, existing from the intertidal zone to the open ocean. Their most common association is the one shared with corals, especially with those found in shallow waters, but can also thrive in deep-water corals as well, locating themselves in the soft epithelial tissue of these. Also, they have been found to share this relationship with many other invertebrates such as sponges, tunicates, sea slugs, and some mollusks.

=== Role in the environment ===
The presence of Endozoicomonas in the marine ecosystem is associated with the overall coral health, serving as a marker of the general well-being of corals and the organisms that inhabit in coral reefs, as well as reducing the presence of pathogenic bacteria that may try to infect the coral. Other functions associated to Endozoicomonas relate to amino acid and vitamin synthesis, in the production of metabolites while contributing with nitrogen and sulfur cycles, and to transfer organic molecules which avidly helps in the nutrition of its host, yet their exact function and the way in which their presence affects all these organisms is still yet to be determined.

During coral bleaching, Endozoicomonas populations remain present in the water in low amounts, indicating a certain level of resilience, and the absence of a healthy coral community leads to changes in the population amounts of these bacteria. Other environmental factors and stressors such as temperature changes, acidification of the ocean, and anthropogenic activities have a direct impact as well in the abundance of these microorganisms in their habitat.

In contrast to their reputation as beneficial symbionts, their genome reveals potential mechanisms for bacterial adaptation and some pathogenic species are being discovered and described to be affecting fish larvae cultures, causing epitheliocystis and further leading to mass mortality.
