= Neptuniibacter pectenicola =

Scientific classification
- Domain: Bacteria
- Kingdom: Pseudomonadati
- Phylum: Pseudomonadota
- Class: Gammaproteobacteria
- Order: Oceanospirillales
- Family: Oceanospirillaceae
- Genus: Neptuniibacter
- Species: N. pectenicola

Binomial name
- Neptuniibacter pectenicola Diéguez et al. 2017

Type strain
- CECT 8936, CECT 8937, LFT 1.8, LRS 1.10

Species of bacterium

Neptuniibacter pectenicola is a Gram-negative, aerobic and motile bacterium from the genus of Neptuniibacter which has been isolated from the scallop Pecten maximus.
