= Neptunomonas naphthovorans =

Scientific classification
- Domain: Bacteria
- Kingdom: Pseudomonadati
- Phylum: Pseudomonadota
- Class: Gammaproteobacteria
- Order: Oceanospirillales
- Family: Oceanospirillaceae
- Genus: Neptunomonas
- Species: N. naphthovorans

Binomial name
- Neptunomonas naphthovorans Hedlund et al. 1999

Species of bacterium

Neptunomonas naphthovorans is a species of bacteria. It is notable for utilising naphthalene as a sole carbon and energy source. Its type strain is NAG-2N-126.
