= Corallomonas stylophorae =

Scientific classification
- Domain: Bacteria
- Kingdom: Pseudomonadati
- Phylum: Pseudomonadota
- Class: Gammaproteobacteria
- Order: Oceanospirillales
- Family: Oceanospirillaceae
- Genus: Corallomonas
- Species: C. stylophorae

Binomial name
- Corallomonas stylophorae Chen et al. 2013

Type strain
- BCRC 80176, Chen KTSW-6, KTSW-6, LMG 25553

Species of bacterium

Corallomonas stylophorae is a Gram-negative, halophilic, facultatively anaerobic and non-motile bacterium from the genus of Corallomonas which has been isolated from the coral Stylophora pistillata in Kenting on Taiwan.
