= Litoribrevibacter albus =

Scientific classification
- Domain: Bacteria
- Kingdom: Pseudomonadati
- Phylum: Pseudomonadota
- Class: Gammaproteobacteria
- Order: Oceanospirillales
- Family: Oceanospirillaceae
- Genus: Litoribrevibacter
- Species: L. albus

Binomial name
- Litoribrevibacter albus Li et al. 2015

Type strain
- MCCC 1F01211, NBRC 110071, Y32

Species of bacterium

Litoribrevibacter albus is a Gram-negative, aerobic and short rod-shaped bacterium from the genus of Litoribrevibacter which has been isolated from coastal seawater from Xiamen in China.
