= Neptuniibacter caesariensis =

Scientific classification
- Domain: Bacteria
- Kingdom: Pseudomonadati
- Phylum: Pseudomonadota
- Class: Gammaproteobacteria
- Order: Oceanospirillales
- Family: Oceanospirillaceae
- Genus: Neptuniibacter
- Species: N. caesariensis

Binomial name
- Neptuniibacter caesariensis Arahal et al. 2007

Type strain
- CCUG 52065, CECT 7075, CIP 109617, MED92

Species of bacterium

Neptuniibacter caesariensis is a Gram-negative, strictly aerobic, slightly halophilic and motile bacterium from the genus of Neptuniibacter which has been isolated from water from the Mediterranean Sea.
