= Neptunomonas concharum =

Scientific classification
- Domain: Bacteria
- Kingdom: Pseudomonadati
- Phylum: Pseudomonadota
- Class: Gammaproteobacteria
- Order: Oceanospirillales
- Family: Oceanospirillaceae
- Genus: Neptunomonas
- Species: N. concharum

Binomial name
- Neptunomonas concharum Lee et al. 2012

Species of bacterium

Neptunomonas concharum is a species of bacteria. It is Gram-negative, facultatively anaerobic, motile and rod-shaped, its type strain being LHW37T (=KACC 15543T =JCM 17730T). This species was first isolated from a dead ark clam, hence the specific epithet "concharum", meaning "of the shells".
