= Marinomonas mediterranea =

Scientific classification
- Domain: Bacteria
- Kingdom: Pseudomonadati
- Phylum: Pseudomonadota
- Class: Gammaproteobacteria
- Order: Oceanospirillales
- Family: Oceanospirillaceae
- Genus: Marinomonas
- Species: M. mediterranea

Binomial name
- Marinomonas mediterranea Solano and Sanchez-Amat 1999

Type strain
- ATCC 700492, CECT 4803, CIP 106128, IAM 14944, JCM 21426, LMG 25235, MMB-1, NBRC 103028, NCIMB 13598, MMB -1

Species of bacterium

Marinomonas mediterranea is a lysogenic bacterium from the genus of Marinomonas which has been isolated from seawater from the coast of the Mediterranean Sea in Spain.
