= Motiliproteus sediminis =

Scientific classification
- Domain: Bacteria
- Kingdom: Pseudomonadati
- Phylum: Pseudomonadota
- Class: Gammaproteobacteria
- Order: Oceanospirillales
- Family: Oceanospirillaceae
- Genus: Motiliproteus
- Species: M. sediminis

Binomial name
- Motiliproteus sediminis Wang et al. 2015

Type strain
- ATCC BAA-2613, CICC 10858, HS6

Species of bacterium

Motiliproteus sediminis is a bacterium from the genus of Motiliproteus which has been isolated from coastal sediments from the Yellow Sea in China.
