= Amphritea opalescens =

Scientific classification
- Domain: Bacteria
- Kingdom: Pseudomonadati
- Phylum: Pseudomonadota
- Class: Gammaproteobacteria
- Order: Oceanospirillales
- Family: Oceanospirillaceae
- Genus: Amphritea
- Species: A. opalescens

Binomial name
- Amphritea opalescens Han et al. 2019

Type strain
- ANRC-JH13

Species of bacterium

Amphritea opalescens is a Gram-negative bacterium from the genus Amphritea which has been isolated from sediments from the beach of Jasper from the Fildes Peninsula.
