= Marinomonas hwangdonensis =

Scientific classification
- Domain: Bacteria
- Kingdom: Pseudomonadati
- Phylum: Pseudomonadota
- Class: Gammaproteobacteria
- Order: Oceanospirillales
- Family: Oceanospirillaceae
- Genus: Marinomonas
- Species: M. hwangdonensis

Binomial name
- Marinomonas hwangdonensis Jung et al. 2012

Type strain
- CCUG 61321, KCTC 23661, HDW-15

Synonyms
- Marinomonas marina

Species of bacterium

Marinomonas hwangdonensis is a Gram-negative, rod-shaped and motile bacterium from the genus of Marinomonas which has been isolated from seawater from the Yellow Sea on Korea.
