= Marinomonas spartinae =

Scientific classification
- Domain: Bacteria
- Kingdom: Pseudomonadati
- Phylum: Pseudomonadota
- Class: Gammaproteobacteria
- Order: Oceanospirillales
- Family: Oceanospirillaceae
- Genus: Marinomonas
- Species: M. spartinae

Binomial name
- Marinomonas spartinae Lucena et al. 2016

Type strain
- CECT 8886, KCTC 42958, SMJ19

Species of bacterium

Marinomonas spartinae is a Gram-negative, chemoorganotrophic, aerobic and halophilic bacterium from the genus of Marinomonas which has been isolated from the plant Spartina maritima.
