= Marinomonas profundimaris =

Scientific classification
- Domain: Bacteria
- Kingdom: Pseudomonadati
- Phylum: Pseudomonadota
- Class: Gammaproteobacteria
- Order: Oceanospirillales
- Family: Oceanospirillaceae
- Genus: Marinomonas
- Species: M. profundimaris

Binomial name
- Marinomonas profundimaris Bai et al. 2015

Type strain
- LMG 27696, MCCC 1A07573, D104, 25BN12M-4

Species of bacterium

Marinomonas profundimaris is a Gram-negative bacterium from the genus of Marinomonas which has been isolated from deep-sea sediments from the Arctic Ocean.
