= Marinomonas atlantica =

Scientific classification
- Domain: Bacteria
- Kingdom: Pseudomonadati
- Phylum: Pseudomonadota
- Class: Gammaproteobacteria
- Order: Oceanospirillales
- Family: Oceanospirillaceae
- Genus: Marinomonas
- Species: M. atlantica

Binomial name
- Marinomonas atlantica Lasa et al. 2016

Type strain
- CECT 9050, LMG 29244, Cmf 18.22

Species of bacterium

Marinomonas atlantica is a bacterium from the genus of Marinomonas which has been isolated from clams of the species Ruditapes decussatus.
