= Bermanella marisrubri =

Scientific classification
- Domain: Bacteria
- Kingdom: Pseudomonadati
- Phylum: Pseudomonadota
- Class: Gammaproteobacteria
- Order: Oceanospirillales
- Family: Oceanospirillaceae
- Genus: Bermanella
- Species: B. marisrubri

Binomial name
- Bermanella marisrubri Pinhassi et al. 2009

Type strain
- CCUG 52064, CECT 7074, RED65

Species of bacterium

Bermanella marisrubri is a heterotrophic, strictly aerobic and motile bacterium from the genus of Bermanella which has been isolated from seawater from the Gulf of Aqaba from the Red Sea in the Middle East.
