= Thalassolituus oleivorans =

Scientific classification
- Domain: Bacteria
- Kingdom: Pseudomonadati
- Phylum: Pseudomonadota
- Class: Gammaproteobacteria
- Order: Oceanospirillales
- Family: Oceanospirillaceae
- Genus: Thalassolituus
- Species: T. oleivorans

Binomial name
- Thalassolituus oleivorans Yakimov et al. 2004

Species of bacterium

Thalassolituus oleivorans is a species of bacteria, the type species of its genus. It is an aerobic, heterotrophic, Gram-negative, curved bacteria that metabolises aliphatic hydrocarbons, their oxidized derivatives and acetate, with type strain MIL-1^{T} (=DSM 14913^{T} =LMG 21420^{T}).
