= Thalassolituus marinus =

Scientific classification
- Domain: Bacteria
- Kingdom: Pseudomonadati
- Phylum: Pseudomonadota
- Class: Gammaproteobacteria
- Order: Oceanospirillales
- Family: Oceanospirillaceae
- Genus: Thalassolituus
- Species: T. marinus

Binomial name
- Thalassolituus marinus Choi and Cho 2013

Species of bacterium

Thalassolituus marinus is a gram negative, rod shaped, motile, hydrocarbon utilizing marine bacterium. Choi and Cho (2013) isolated Thalassolituus marinus from a surface seawater sample of the Yellow Sea. S.I. Paul et al. (2021) isolated and characterized Thalassolituus marinus from marine sponge (Cliona carteri) of the Saint Martin's Island of the Bay of Bengal, Bangladesh. The type strain of Thalassolituus marinus is IMCC1826T (=KCTC 23084T = NBRC 107590T).
