= Marinomonas dokdonensis =

Scientific classification
- Domain: Bacteria
- Kingdom: Pseudomonadati
- Phylum: Pseudomonadota
- Class: Gammaproteobacteria
- Order: Oceanospirillales
- Family: Oceanospirillaceae
- Genus: Marinomonas
- Species: M. dokdonensis

Binomial name
- Marinomonas dokdonensis Yoon et al. 2005

Type strain
- DSM 17202, DSW10-10, KCTC 12394

Species of bacterium

Marinomonas dokdonensis is a Gram-negative, non-spore-forming, slightly halophilic and motile bacterium from the genus of Marinomonas which has been isolated from sea water from Korea.
