= Marinomonas mangrovi =

Scientific classification
- Domain: Bacteria
- Kingdom: Pseudomonadati
- Phylum: Pseudomonadota
- Class: Gammaproteobacteria
- Order: Oceanospirillales
- Family: Oceanospirillaceae
- Genus: Marinomonas
- Species: M. mangrovi

Binomial name
- Marinomonas mangrovi Zhang and Margesin 2015

Type strain
- DSM 28136, LMG 28077, B20-1, BG-6-R4

Species of bacterium

Marinomonas mangrovi is a Gram-negative bacterium from the genus of Marinomonas which has been isolated from rhizospheric soil from a mangrove forest on Beigang Island in Hainan province, China.
