= Oceanobacter kriegii =

Scientific classification
- Domain: Bacteria
- Kingdom: Pseudomonadati
- Phylum: Pseudomonadota
- Class: Gammaproteobacteria
- Order: Oceanospirillales
- Family: Oceanospirillaceae
- Genus: Oceanobacter
- Species: O. kriegii

Binomial name
- Oceanobacter kriegii (Bowditch et al. 1984) Satomi et al. 2002

Type strain
- ATCC 27133, Baumann 197, CCUG 16057, CIP 103443, DSM 6294, IFO 15467, LMG 6238, NBRC 15467, NCIMB 2042, NCMB 2042

Synonyms
- Oceanospirillum kriegii

Species of bacterium

Oceanobacter kriegii is a mesophilic bacterium from the genus of Oceanobacter which has been isolated from seawater from the United States.
