= Marinomonas rhizomae =

Scientific classification
- Domain: Bacteria
- Kingdom: Pseudomonadati
- Phylum: Pseudomonadota
- Class: Gammaproteobacteria
- Order: Oceanospirillales
- Family: Oceanospirillaceae
- Genus: Marinomonas
- Species: M. rhizomae

Binomial name
- Marinomonas rhizomae Lucas-Elío et al. 2011

Type strain
- CECT 7377, IVIA-Po-145, NCIMB 14431

Species of bacterium

Marinomonas rhizomae is a bacterium from the genus of Marinomonas which has been isolated from the seagrass Posidonia oceanica.
