= Marinomonas aquiplantarum =

Scientific classification
- Domain: Bacteria
- Kingdom: Pseudomonadati
- Phylum: Pseudomonadota
- Class: Gammaproteobacteria
- Order: Oceanospirillales
- Family: Oceanospirillaceae
- Genus: Marinomonas
- Species: M. aquiplantarum

Binomial name
- Marinomonas aquiplantarum Lucas-Elío et al. 2011

Species of bacterium

Marinomonas aquiplantarum is a Gram-negative and aerobic bacterium from the genus of Marinomonas which has been isolated from the seagrass Posidonia oceanica.
