= Neptunomonas antarctica =

Scientific classification
- Domain: Bacteria
- Kingdom: Pseudomonadati
- Phylum: Pseudomonadota
- Class: Gammaproteobacteria
- Order: Oceanospirillales
- Family: Oceanospirillaceae
- Genus: Neptunomonas
- Species: N. antarctica

Binomial name
- Neptunomonas antarctica Zhang et al. 2010

Species of bacterium

Neptunomonas antarctica is a species of bacteria. It is Gram-negative, motile, facultatively aerobic and oxidase- and catalase-positive. The type strain is S3-22^{T} (=CCTCC AB 209086^{T}=KACC 14056^{T}).
