= Nitrincola lacisaponensis =

Scientific classification
- Domain: Bacteria
- Kingdom: Pseudomonadati
- Phylum: Pseudomonadota
- Class: Gammaproteobacteria
- Order: Oceanospirillales
- Family: Oceanospirillaceae
- Genus: Nitrincola
- Species: N. lacisaponensis

Binomial name
- Nitrincola lacisaponensis Dimitriu et al. 2005

Type strain
- 4CA, ATCC BAA-920, DSM 16316

Synonyms
- Nitrumincola lacisaponis

Species of bacterium

Nitrincola lacisaponensis is a gram-negative, non-spore-forming and motile bacterium from the genus of Nitrincola which has been isolated from decomposing wood from the Soap Lake from Grant County in the United States.
