= Neptunomonas qingdaonensis =

Scientific classification
- Domain: Bacteria
- Kingdom: Pseudomonadati
- Phylum: Pseudomonadota
- Class: Gammaproteobacteria
- Order: Oceanospirillales
- Family: Oceanospirillaceae
- Genus: Neptunomonas
- Species: N. qingdaonensis

Binomial name
- Neptunomonas qingdaonensis Liu et al. 2013

Species of bacterium

Neptunomonas qingdaonensis is a species of bacteria. It is Gram-negative, motile, aerobic, oxidase- and catalase-positive and rod-shaped. The type strain is P10-2-4(T) ( = CGMCC 1.10971(T) = KCTC 23686(T)).
