= Endozoicomonas atrinae =

Scientific classification
- Domain: Bacteria
- Kingdom: Pseudomonadati
- Phylum: Pseudomonadota
- Class: Gammaproteobacteria
- Order: Oceanospirillales
- Family: Endozoicomonadaceae
- Genus: Endozoicomonas
- Species: E. atrinae

Binomial name
- Endozoicomonas atrinae Hyun et al. 2014

Type strain
- JCM 19190, KACC 17474, strain WP70

Species of bacterium

Endozoicomonas atrinae is a Gram-negative, rod-shaped, aerobic and non-motile bacterium from the genus Endozoicomonas which has been isolated from the intestinal tract of the mollusk Atrina pectinata from Yeosu in Korea.
