= Neptuniibacter =

Scientific classification
- Domain: Bacteria
- Kingdom: Pseudomonadati
- Phylum: Pseudomonadota
- Class: Gammaproteobacteria
- Order: Oceanospirillales
- Family: Oceanospirillaceae
- Genus: Neptuniibacter; Arahal et al. 2007

Type species
- Neptuniibacter caesariensis

Species
- N. caesariensis N. marinus N. pectenicola N. halophilus

Genus of bacteria

Neptuniibacter is a bacterial genus from the family of Oceanospirillaceae.
