= Nitrincola =

Scientific classification
- Domain: Bacteria
- Kingdom: Pseudomonadati
- Phylum: Pseudomonadota
- Class: Gammaproteobacteria
- Order: Oceanospirillales
- Family: Oceanospirillaceae
- Genus: Nitrincola; Dimitriu et al. 2005

Type species
- Nitrincola lacisaponensi

Species
- N. alkalisediminis N. nitratireducens N. lacisaponensis

Synonyms
- Nitrumincola

Genus of bacteria

Nitrincola is a bacteria genus from the family of Oceanospirillaceae.
