= Endozoicomonas ascidiicola =

Scientific classification
- Domain: Bacteria
- Kingdom: Pseudomonadati
- Phylum: Pseudomonadota
- Class: Gammaproteobacteria
- Order: Oceanospirillales
- Family: Endozoicomonadaceae
- Genus: Endozoicomonas
- Species: E. ascidiicola

Binomial name
- Endozoicomonas ascidiicola Schreiber et al. 2016

Type strain
- DSM 100913, AVMART05, KASP37, LMG 29095

Species of bacterium

Endozoicomonas ascidiicola is a Gram-negative, facultative anaerobic, chemoorganoheterotrophic, rod-shaped and motile bacterium from the genus Endozoicomonas which has been isolated from a sea squirts (Ascidiella) from Gullmarsfjord in Sweden.
