= Spongiispira =

Scientific classification
- Domain: Bacteria
- Kingdom: Pseudomonadati
- Phylum: Pseudomonadota
- Class: Gammaproteobacteria
- Order: Oceanospirillales
- Family: Oceanospirillaceae
- Genus: Spongiispira; Kaesler et al. 2008

Type species
- Spongiispira norvegica

Species
- S. norvegica

Genus of bacteria

Spongiispira is a bacteria genus from the family of Oceanospirillaceae with one known species (Spongiispira norvegica).
