= Oleispira =

Scientific classification
- Domain: Bacteria
- Kingdom: Pseudomonadati
- Phylum: Pseudomonadota
- Class: Gammaproteobacteria
- Order: Oceanospirillales
- Family: Oceanospirillaceae
- Genus: Oleispira; Yakimov et al. 2003

Type species
- Oleispira antarctica

Species
- O. antarctica O. lenta

Genus of bacteria

Oleispira is a psychrophilic bacteria genus from the family of Oceanospirillaceae.
