= Bacterioplanes =

Scientific classification
- Domain: Bacteria
- Kingdom: Pseudomonadati
- Phylum: Pseudomonadota
- Class: Gammaproteobacteria
- Order: Oceanospirillales
- Family: Oceanospirillaceae
- Genus: Bacterioplanes; Wang et al. 2016

Type species
- Bacterioplanes sanyensis

Species
- B. sanyensis

Genus of bacteria

Bacterioplanes is a bacterial genus from the family of Oceanospirillaceae, with one known species (Bacterioplanes sanyensis).
