= Endozoicomonas acroporae =

Scientific classification
- Domain: Bacteria
- Kingdom: Pseudomonadati
- Phylum: Pseudomonadota
- Class: Gammaproteobacteria
- Order: Oceanospirillales
- Family: Endozoicomonadaceae
- Genus: Endozoicomonas
- Species: E. acroporae

Binomial name
- Endozoicomonas acroporae Sheu et al. 2017

Type strain
- BCRC 80922, KCTC 42901, LMG 29482, Acr-14

Species of bacterium

Endozoicomonas acroporae is a Gram-negative, rod-shaped, aerobic and non-motile bacterium from the genus Endozoicomonas which has been isolated from the coral Acropora.
