= Litoribacillus =

Scientific classification
- Domain: Bacteria
- Kingdom: Pseudomonadati
- Phylum: Pseudomonadota
- Class: Gammaproteobacteria
- Order: Oceanospirillales
- Family: Oceanospirillaceae
- Genus: Litoribacillus; Zhao et al. 2014

Type species
- Litoribacillus peritrichatus

Species
- L. peritrichatus

Genus of bacteria

Litoribacillus is a bacterial genus from the family of Oceanospirillaceae, with one known species (Litoribacillus peritrichatus).

Litoribacillus are defined by their ability to ferment glucose into lactic acid. These bacteria are widely distributed in animal feeds, silage, manure, milk and milk products. It They can survive in both aerobic (with oxygen) and anaerobic (without oxygen) environments. The type species, Lactobacillus delbrueckii, is about 0.5‑0.8 μm wide and 2‑9 μm long; can appear singly or in small chains. Some species are homofermentative (produce lactic acid almost exclusively), e.g., L. acidophilus, L. casei, L. plantarum. Others are heterofermentative (produce lactic acid plus ethanol, acetic acid, CO_{2}), e.g., L. brevis, L. fermentum.

== Importance and uses ==
Lactobacillus species are used commercially in the production of many fermented foods: sour milks, cheeses, yogurts, fermented vegetables (pickles, sauerkraut), sourdough breads, some sausages. They are also commensal (naturally occurring) inhabitants of human bodies: gastrointestinal tract, mouth, vagina. Because of this, some preparations of Lactobacillus are used as probiotics, to help restore normal flora (balance of microorganisms) after disruption (e.g., antibiotic therapy).
