= Endozoicomonas arenosclerae =

Scientific classification
- Domain: Bacteria
- Kingdom: Pseudomonadati
- Phylum: Pseudomonadota
- Class: Gammaproteobacteria
- Order: Oceanospirillales
- Family: Endozoicomonadaceae
- Genus: Endozoicomonas
- Species: E. arenosclerae

Binomial name
- Endozoicomonas arenosclerae Appolinario et al. 2016

Type strain
- CBAS 572, Ab112, Ab227_MC, E-MC227

Species of bacterium

Endozoicomonas arenosclerae is a bacterium from the genus Endozoicomonas. Endozoicomonas arenosclerae occur in the flora of the sponge Arenosclera brasiliensis.
