= Bermanella =

Scientific classification
- Domain: Bacteria
- Kingdom: Pseudomonadati
- Phylum: Pseudomonadota
- Class: Gammaproteobacteria
- Order: Oceanospirillales
- Family: Oceanospirillaceae
- Genus: Bermanella; Pinhassi et al. 2009

Type species
- Bermanella marisrubri

Species
- B. marisrubri

Genus of bacteria

Bermanella is a bacteria genus from the family of Oceanospirillaceae, with one known species (Bermanella marisrubri).
