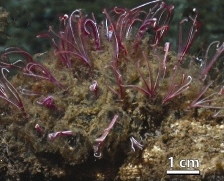

Scientific classification
- Kingdom: Animalia
- Phylum: Annelida
- Clade: Pleistoannelida
- Clade: Sedentaria
- Order: Sabellida
- Family: Siboglinidae
- Genus: Osedax
- Species: O. frankpressi

Binomial name
- Osedax frankpressi Rouse, Goffredi & Vrijenhoek, 2004

= Osedax frankpressi =

Species of annelid worm

Osedax frankpressi is a species of bathypelagic polychaete worm that lives on the seabed and sustains itself on the bones of dead whales. It can be found in the East North Pacific Ocean. The specific epithet is named in honor of Frank Press "for his distinguished service to science".

== Description ==
These worms were first described in 2004, after having been found on the carcase of a gray whale in Monterey Canyon, off the coast of California, at a depth of 2,891 m (9,500 ft). When seen on a whale carcase, O. frankpressi has a pinkish trunk with a tuft of red and white plumes on the tip, somewhat resembling a flower. Hidden below the surface of the carcase are greenish root-like structures and white ovaries. Like other species of Osedax, these worms have no mouth and no gut.

== Ecology ==
The death of a whale, or any substantial carcase that falls to the seabed, provides an abundant nutritional opportunity for organisms living in the depths and otherwise dependent on marine snow. Osedax frankpressi is a small worm that speedily colonises the skeleton, sending out root-like threads that force their way into the bone marrow and absorb the nutrients. Inside these root structures are bacteria in the order Oceanospirillales with which the worm is in symbiosis. It is probable that the presence of these bacteria, with their ability to metabolise organic material, enables the worms to live on carcases.

This worm has developed an unusual reproductive strategy to suit its circumstances, these being an occasional superabundance of food, in widely scattered locations, appearing at irregular intervals. Up to 900,000 individual worms have been found on a single carcase. It is thought that larvae that settle on carcases all develop into female worms, while larvae that settle on the female worms develop into microscopic males and are incorporated into the female worms' tissues. Here they remain, with up to 100 males per female worm, providing sperm for their fecund partners. The female worms produce offspring continually. The vast majority of larvae will never find a suitable place to settle, but sufficient numbers will do so to provide the next generation of worms.
