= Balneatrix =

Scientific classification
- Domain: Bacteria
- Kingdom: Pseudomonadati
- Phylum: Pseudomonadota
- Class: Gammaproteobacteria
- Order: Oceanospirillales
- Family: Oceanospirillaceae
- Genus: Balneatrix; Dauga et al. 1993

Type species
- Balneatrix alpica

Species
- B. alpica

Genus of bacteria

Balneatrix is a gram-negative, aerobic and motile bacteria genus from the family of Oceanospirillaceae with one known species (Balneatrix alpica).
