= Bacterioplanoides =

Scientific classification
- Domain: Bacteria
- Kingdom: Pseudomonadati
- Phylum: Pseudomonadota
- Class: Gammaproteobacteria
- Order: Oceanospirillales
- Family: Oceanospirillaceae
- Genus: Bacterioplanoides; Wang et al. 2016

Type species
- Bacterioplanoides pacificum

Species
- B. pacificum

Genus of bacteria

Bacterioplanoides is a bacteria genus from the family of Oceanospirillaceae with one known species (Bacterioplanoides pacificum).
