= Litoribrevibacter =

Scientific classification
- Domain: Bacteria
- Kingdom: Pseudomonadati
- Phylum: Pseudomonadota
- Class: Gammaproteobacteria
- Order: Oceanospirillales
- Family: Oceanospirillaceae
- Genus: Litoribrevibacter; Li et al. 2015

Type species
- Litoribrevibacter albus

Species
- L. albus

Genus of bacteria

Litoribrevibacter is a bacteria genus from the family of Oceanospirillaceae, with one known species (Litoribrevibacter albus).
