= Oceaniserpentilla haliotis =

Scientific classification
- Domain: Bacteria
- Kingdom: Pseudomonadati
- Phylum: Pseudomonadota
- Class: Gammaproteobacteria
- Order: Oceanospirillales
- Family: Oceanospirillaceae
- Genus: Oceaniserpentilla; Schlösser et al. 2008
- Species: O. haliotis

Binomial name
- Oceaniserpentilla haliotis Schlösser et al. 2008

Type strain
- DSM 19503, L+S No 03319806, LMG 24225

Synonyms
- Oceaniserpentilla haliotidis

Species of bacterium

Oceaniserpentilla haliotis is a gram-negative and aerobic bacterium which has been isolated from the haemolymph serum of the sea snail Haliotis rubra from Tasmania in Australia. Oceaniserpentilla haliotis has the ability to degrade crude oil. It is the only species in the genus Oceaniserpentilla.
