= NMT1 RNA motif =

NMT1
- Consensus secondary structure and sequence conservation of NMT1 RNA

Identifiers
- Symbol: NMT1
- Rfam: RF03054

Other data
- RNA type: Cis-reg
- SO: SO:0005836
- PDB structures: PDBe

The NMT1 RNA motif is a conserved RNA structure that was discovered by bioinformatics. NMT1 motif RNAs are found in Pseudomonadota. There is also one NMT1 RNA in each of Bacteroidota and Actinomycetota, but these appear to be the result of recent horizontal gene transfer or sequence contamination before or during genome sequencing

NMT1 has been shown to act as part of a xanthane riboswitch that turns off gene expression when the ligand is bound.

The NMT1 motif RNA were thought to likely function as cis-regulatory elements, in view of their positions upstream of protein-coding genes. Indeed, the RNAs are upstream of multiple genes that encode non-homologous proteins. If all examples of the RNA were upstream of homologous genes, there is the possibility that the RNAs were conserved in that position simply by inheritance. The non-homology of the genes downstream of NMT1 RNAs makes this scenario less likely.

The most common type of gene that is apparently regulated by NMT1 RNAs is NMT1. These genes are regulated by thiamin in yeast. Another gene class frequently regulated by NMT1 RNAs are those encoding dioxygenase. However, the substrate specificity of these enzymes has not been predicted. Some NMT1 RNAs apparently regulate genes that encode deaminases. In a previous, unrelated study, some enzymes operated in vitro as deaminases of isoxanthopterin, although it is not believed that this is their natural substrate. Proteins with similar sequences had mutations that resulted in uncertainty as to whether or not they would also use isoxanthopterin as a substrate. These ambiguous proteins are regulated by NMT1 RNAs, e.g., with locus tags PputW619_2587 (in Pseudomonas putida W619), PP_3209 (in Pseudomonas putida KT2440) and Mmwyl1_4101 (in a Marinomonas species).
