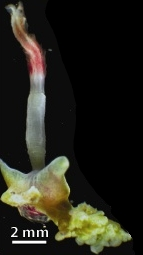
- Osedax roseus

Scientific classification
- Kingdom: Animalia
- Phylum: Annelida
- Clade: Pleistoannelida
- Clade: Sedentaria
- Order: Sabellida
- Family: Siboglinidae
- Genus: Osedax; Rouse et al., 2004

Species
- See text.

= Osedax =

Osedax Temporal range: Albian–Present

Genus of annelid worms

Osedax is a genus of siboglinid polychaetes, commonly called snot worms, bone-eating worms, or zombie worms. Osedax is Latin for 'bone devourer', derived from the worms' unique ecological niche of bone-boring. Osedax settle on a bone, then secrete an acid through specialized root tissues to dissolve the bone's external layers in order to access the lipids within. Osedax act as ecosystem engineers, enhancing the biodiversity of bones they inhabit by increasing their structural complexity, allowing microfauna to inhabit otherwise inaccessible regions of the internal bone.

Scientists from the Monterey Bay Aquarium Research Institute using the submarine ROV Tiburon first discovered the genus in Monterey Bay, California, in February 2002. The worms were found living on the bones of a decaying gray whale in the Monterey Canyon, at a depth of 2,893 m (9,491 ft).

== Anatomy and physiology ==
Like other siboglinids, Osedax lacks a mouth, gut, or anus, and instead depends on colonies of endosymbiont microbes housed inside a trophosome for nutrition. Unlike other siboglinids, however, this trophosome takes the form of a vascularized root system which penetrates bone. These microbes, of the order Oceanospirillales, produce enzymes which hydrolyze collagen from bones, yielding nutrition to the worms. Osedax exhibit very drastic sexual dimorphism, with females being >20,000 times larger than males. Males are paedomorphic and microscopic, inhabiting a section of the females' trunk where they produce sperm from yolk reserves.

=== Digestive system ===
Osedax rely on symbiotic species of bacteria that aid in the digestion of whale proteins and lipids and release nutrients that the worms can absorb. Osedax have colorful feathery plumes that also act as gills and unusual root-like structures that absorb nutrients. The Osedax secrete acid (rather than rely on teeth) to bore into bone to access the nutrients. High concentrations of carbonic anhydrase are found in the roots of Osedax. This serves as evidence of a common bioerosion mechanism in which secreted acid is produced by aerobic respiration. This process works with a demineralization mechanism in which oxygen is carried from seawater to the roots and HCO−
3 is secreted into the seawater.

The epidermis also plays key roles in bone deterioration and nutrient uptake. This process of bone deterioration occurs through a symbiotic relationship with an endosymbiotic bacteria. The cells in the epidermis of the Osedax root region are responsible for the secretion of digestive enzymes. The epidermis also has an expanded microvillus border which increases the surface area.

Through the use of X-ray CT technology, scans showed that borings made by Osedax mucofloris were hemi-ellipsoidal in shape. Boring depths varied depending on which bone was colonized by the O. mucofloris. Deeper borings were found in radius bone compared to the ulna and vertebrae.

Osedax roots are covered by a mucus sheath that helps protect the worm's trunk. Some studies support the theory that this sheath plays a role in dissolving the bone. This sheath could also play an important role in reducing the damage to Osedax skin by absorbing harmful acid. Another potential function of the mucus sheath is that it could inhibit the breakdown of the worm's bone matrix. This is significant because the bone matrix is integral in maintaining the worm's position while in direct contact with a bone.

=== Symbiosis ===
Symbionts are the primary providers of nutrition for Osedax. However, these symbionts also possess genes, secretion systems, and toxins that disrupt the Osedax membrane and facilitate recurrent infections of adult Osedax through the root tips. There is ongoing debate in the literature over whether the symbiosis in Osedax roots is commensal or mutualistic. The symbiotic relationship between Osedax and its accompanying bacteria may be transferred either via vertical or horizontal transmission.

Osedax species use collagen, which is the primary organic component in bone. Collagen is degraded using a family of endopeptidases called matrix metalloproteinases (MMPs), which facilitates nutrient absorption by the Osedax. The roots of the Osedax express high amounts of V-ATPase and carbonic anhydrase enzymes, which allows the Osedax to dissolve and absorb collagen and lipids. Once dissolved, the nutrients are either used by the Osedax, or transported to the symbionts for further catabolism.

As the endosymbionts lack secreted M9 peptidase, they rely on the Osedax worm to source extracellular collagen. The symbionts in the Oceanospirillales order have then been observed to further process the collagen using collagenolytic enzymes.

Sequencing of the Osedax worm genome has suggested an evolved dependency on its endosymbionts. This is revealed by genomic streamlining, where increased functional groups were observed despite the loss of some gene families. Six incomplete pathways were discovered in the Osedax worm genome which were supplemented by the endosymbionts. In particular, the Osedax worm lacks specific gene families involved in bone lipid and carbohydrate metabolism. This function is complemented by the Oceanospirillales symbionts, which utilize the glyoxylate cycle to catabolize nutrients from whale bones and convert fatty acids into carbohydrates. The Osedax are then able to take up and store the end products as glycogen. Bacteriocytes are present in the Osedax lower trunk subepidermal connective tissue, and there are additional genes in the bacteriocytes that encode amino acids and glucose and aid in digestion and absorption of proteins into the roots.

=== Endosymbionts ===
The Oceanospirillales symbionts are found in the specialized roots of all Osedax species, and play a major role in accelerating the degradation process of bones, as well as facilitating nutrient uptake for the Osedax. Oceanospirillales are known for their ability to degrade complex organic compounds.

Campylobacterales are abundant along the trunk of the Osedax according to a 2023 study. Different genera in this order are found in Osedax at different points during the whale's degradation:

1. Members of the Arcobacter genus are the primary early colonizers (<24 months).
2. Sulfurospirillum genus members colonize at ~50 months, during the transitional stages of organic carbon breakdown.
3. The Sulfurimonas genus dominates at >140 months, and are key players in its symbiosis with the Osedax host.

The Sulfurimonas genus in particular protects the Osedax worms from potentially harmful by-products produced at >140 months of the whale fall degradation. The Sulfurimonas bacteria house the type II and IV sulfide:quinone oxidoreductase genes that encode enzymes to oxidize and assimilate sulfide. These reactions prevent the host from absorbing toxic by-products across the epithelial barrier.

== Sexual dimorphism and life cycle ==
Osedax males are notably smaller than their female counterparts. Between 50 and 100 microscopic dwarf males live inside the tube surrounding a single female and never develop past the larval stage; they produce sperm from yolk reserves. Male dwarfism prevents competition with female Osedax worms for food and space. Conditions that favour dwarfism in male Osedax are:

1. Eliminates competition between male and female Osedax as resources are limited,
2. Sessile lifestyle: attach to and rely on females for food,
3. Decreases difficulty in finding a mate.

Interestingly, Osedax priapus lack the frequently observed male dwarfism. Males live freely and compete for space and food with females. Being larger, they produce and carry more sperm. However, sexual size dimorphism is still observed in O. priapus: most males are one-third the volume of females.

Annelid sex is typically determined by genetic factors, however models of environmental sex determination have been proposed for Osedax, in which larvae that settle on bones mature into females, while larvae that settle on female Osedax do not fully develop and mature into males. Osedax japonicus in particular has showcased an environmental form of sex determination.

=== Life cycle ===
Female Osedax worms have been observed spawning both in the wild and in laboratory aquaria. Osedax rubiplumus can spawn hundreds of oocytes at a time. They are already fertilized when they are released from the female worm. The worms' endosymbionts, species of bacteria in the order Oceanospirillales, were not observed in the spawned oocytes, which suggests that they are acquired after the worms settle on the bones. Osedax appears to be highly fecund and reproduces continuously.

- Mature female Osedax worms spawn eggs into the mucus attached to their tubes, where the embryos develop for 3 days.
- Larvae then begin to swim in the water column. This is called the trochophore stage. The larvae settle on whale bones and begin crawling.
- During the trocophore stage, male Osedax settle on the tubes of the females, where they are metamorphosed into dwarf males, which can be inside or outside the female tube.
- 1 day after settling on bones, larvae use two pairs of chaetae to attach to the substrate. Juvenile worms begin to secrete mucus and develop two ventral palps on the dorsal side of the prostomium.
- 2 days after settling, the palps elongate and the heart starts to beat. The roots attach to the bones begin to digest.
- 4 days after settling, the trunk and ventral palps elongate, where symbiotic bacteria are detected in the root.
- 7 days after settlement, pinnules extend from the ventral palps.
- 10 days post settlement, the juvenile worms have 4 palps with pinnules, an oviduct, and a distinct root system.

== Ecology ==
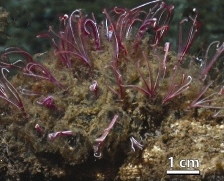
Osedax frankpressi

When initially discovered, some scientists proposed that Osedax was a whale-bone specialist, a notion later disproven by the discovery of Osedax on a variety of skeletal substrates including bone fragments, teleost bones, shark teeth, reptile and bird skeletons, pinniped bones, experimentally placed cow bones, and even human remains. Multiple species of Osedax can co-exist in close proximity, even on the same bone.

Osedax and their borings enhance local biodiversity by dissolving the tough external cortical bone and tunneling through their internal layers, increasing structural complexity and providing new regions for microfauna to colonize. As such, Osedax are considered ecosystem engineers. However, these borings compromise the structural integrity of the bones, causing them to collapse after extensive boring, rendering these new habitats temporary. The role of Osedax in the degradation of marine vertebrate remains is important to marine vertebrate taphonomy.

== Evolution ==
The oldest trace fossils on bones characteristic of Osedax are from a plesiosaur humerus from the Cambridge Greensand, England, likely reworked from late Albian (c. 100 million years old) sediments and a rib and costal plate from a sea turtle found in Cenomanian (100–93 million years ago) aged sediments of the Chalk Group, England. Further material is known from the Campanian and Maastrichtian. Following the extinction of almost all large marine reptiles at the end of the Cretaceous, Osedax likely persisted on the bones of sea turtles, marine birds, and fish.

== Species ==
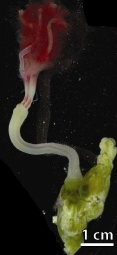
Osedax rubiplumus

Selected species:

- Osedax antarcticus Glover, Wiklund & Dahlgren, 2013
- Osedax bozoi Berman, Hiley, Read & Rouse, 2024
- Osedax braziliensis Fujiwara, Jimi, Sumida, Kawato, Kitazato
- Osedax bryani Rouse, Goffredi, Johnson & Vrijenhoek
- Osedax byronbayensis Georgieva, Wiklund, Ramos, Neal, Glasby & Gunton, 2023
- Osedax craigmcclaini Berman, Hiley, Read, Rouse, 2024
- Osedax crouchi Amon, Wiklund, Dahlgren, Copley, Smith, Jamieson & Glover, 2014
- Osedax deceptionensis Taboada, Cristobo, Avila, Wiklund & Glover, 2013
- Osedax docricketts Rouse, Goffredi, Johnson & Vrijenhoek
- Osedax estcourti Berman, Hiley, Read & Rouse, 2024
- Osedax fenrisi Eilertsen, Dahlgren & Rapp, 2020
- Osedax frankpressi Rouse, Goffredi & Vrijenhoek, 2004
- Osedax jabba Rouse, Goffredi, Johnson & Vrijenhoek
- Osedax japonicus Fujikura, Fujiwara & Kawato, 2006
- Osedax knutei Rouse, Goffredi, Johnson & Vrijenhoek
- Osedax lehmani Rouse, Goffredi, Johnson & Vrijenhoek
- Osedax lonnyi Rouse, Goffredi, Johnson & Vrijenhoek
- Osedax mucofloris Glover, Kallstrom, Smith & Dahlgren, 2005
- Osedax nataliae Gularte, Sumida, Bergamo & Rouse, 2024
- Osedax nordenskjoeldi Amon, Wiklund, Dahlgren, Copley, Smith, Jamieson & Glover, 2014
- Osedax priapus Rouse et al., 2014
- Osedax packardorum Rouse, Goffredi, Johnson & Vrijenhoek
- Osedax randyi Rouse, Goffredi, Johnson & Vrijenhoek
- Osedax rogersi Amon, Wiklund, Dahlgren, Copley, Smith, Jamieson & Glover, 2014
- Osedax roseus Rouse, Worsaae, Johnson, Jones & Vrijenhoek, 2008
- Osedax rubiplumus Rouse, Goffredi & Vrijenhoek, 2004
- Osedax ryderi Rouse, Goffredi, Johnson & Vrijenhoek
- Osedax sigridae Rouse, Goffredi, Johnson & Vrijenhoek
- Osedax talkovici Rouse, Goffredi, Johnson & Vrijenhoek
- Osedax tiburon Rouse, Goffredi, Johnson & Vrijenhoek
- Osedax traceyae Berman, Hiley, Read & Rouse, 2024
- Osedax ventana Rouse, Goffredi, Johnson & Vrijenhoek
- Osedax waadjum Georgieva, Wiklund, Ramos, Neal, Glasby & Gunton, 2023
- Osedax westernflyer Rouse, Goffredi, Johnson & Vrijenhoek
