= Profundimonas =

Scientific classification
- Domain: Bacteria
- Kingdom: Pseudomonadati
- Phylum: Pseudomonadota
- Class: Gammaproteobacteria
- Order: Oceanospirillales
- Family: Oceanospirillaceae
- Genus: Profundimonas; Cao et al. 2014

Type species
- Profundimonas piezophila

Species
- P. piezophila

Genus of bacteria

Profundimonas is a gram-negative, facultatively anaerobic and heterotroph bacteria genus. It is in the family of Oceanospirillaceae. It has one known species, Profundimonas piezophila. The species was isolated from deep seawater from Puerto Rico.
