= Motiliproteus =

Scientific classification
- Domain: Bacteria
- Kingdom: Pseudomonadati
- Phylum: Pseudomonadota
- Class: Gammaproteobacteria
- Order: Oceanospirillales
- Family: Oceanospirillaceae
- Genus: Motiliproteus; Wang et al. 2015

Type species
- Motiliproteus sediminis

Species
- M. sediminis

Genus of bacteria

Motiliproteus is a bacteria genus from the family of Oceanospirillaceae, with one known species (Motiliproteus sediminis).
