= Thalassolituus =

Scientific classification
- Domain: Bacteria
- Kingdom: Pseudomonadati
- Phylum: Pseudomonadota
- Class: Gammaproteobacteria
- Order: Oceanospirillales
- Family: Oceanospirillaceae
- Genus: Thalassolituus; Yakimov et al. 2004

Type species
- Thalassolituus oleivorans

Species
- T. marinus T. oleivorans

Genus of bacteria

Thalassolituus is an oil-degrading bacterial genus from the family of Oceanospirillaceae. Thalassolituus is a gram-negative, rod-shaped marine bacteria. S.I. Paul et al. (2021) isolated and characterized Thalassolituus species (Thalassolituus marinus) from marine sponge (Cliona carteri) of the Saint Martin's Island of the Bay of Bengal, Bangladesh.
