= Marinospirillum =

Scientific classification
- Domain: Bacteria
- Kingdom: Pseudomonadati
- Phylum: Pseudomonadota
- Class: Gammaproteobacteria
- Order: Oceanospirillales
- Family: Oceanospirillaceae
- Genus: Marinospirillum; Satomi et al. 1998

Species
- Marinospirillum alkaliphilum Marinospirillum celere Marinospirillum insulare Marinospirillum megaterium Marinospirillum minutulum

Genus of bacteria

Marinospirillum is a bacteria genus from the family Oceanospirillaceae.
