= Corallomonas =

Scientific classification
- Domain: Bacteria
- Kingdom: Pseudomonadati
- Phylum: Pseudomonadota
- Class: Gammaproteobacteria
- Order: Oceanospirillales
- Family: Oceanospirillaceae
- Genus: Corallomonas; Chen et al. 2013

Type species
- Corallomonas stylophorae

Species
- C. stylophorae

Genus of bacteria

Corallomonas is a bacteria genus from the family of Oceanospirillaceae, with one known species (Corallomonas stylophorae).
