= Oceanobacter =

Scientific classification
- Domain: Bacteria
- Kingdom: Pseudomonadati
- Phylum: Pseudomonadota
- Class: Gammaproteobacteria
- Order: Oceanospirillales
- Family: Oceanospirillaceae
- Genus: Oceanobacter; Satomi et al. 2002

Type species
- Oceanobacter kriegii

Species
- O. kriegii

Genus of bacteria

Oceanobacter is a bacterial genus from the family of Oceanospirillaceae with one known species (Oceanobacter kriegii).
