= Neptunomonas =

Scientific classification
- Domain: Bacteria
- Kingdom: Pseudomonadati
- Phylum: Pseudomonadota
- Class: Gammaproteobacteria
- Order: Oceanospirillales
- Family: Oceanospirillaceae
- Genus: Neptunomonas; Hedlund et al. 1999

Type species
- Neptunomonas naphthovorans

Species
- Neptunomonas acidivorans Neptunomonas antarctica Neptunomonas concharum Neptunomonas japonica Neptunomonas naphthovorans Neptunomonas phycophila Neptunomonas qingdaonensis

Genus of bacteria

Neptunomonas is an anaerobic and rod-shaped genus of bacteria from the family of Oceanospirillaceae.
