= Osedax priapus =

Scientific classification
- Kingdom: Animalia
- Phylum: Annelida
- Clade: Pleistoannelida
- Clade: Sedentaria
- Order: Sabellida
- Family: Siboglinidae
- Genus: Osedax
- Species: O. priapus

Binomial name
- Osedax priapus Rouse et al., 2015,

Species of annelid worm

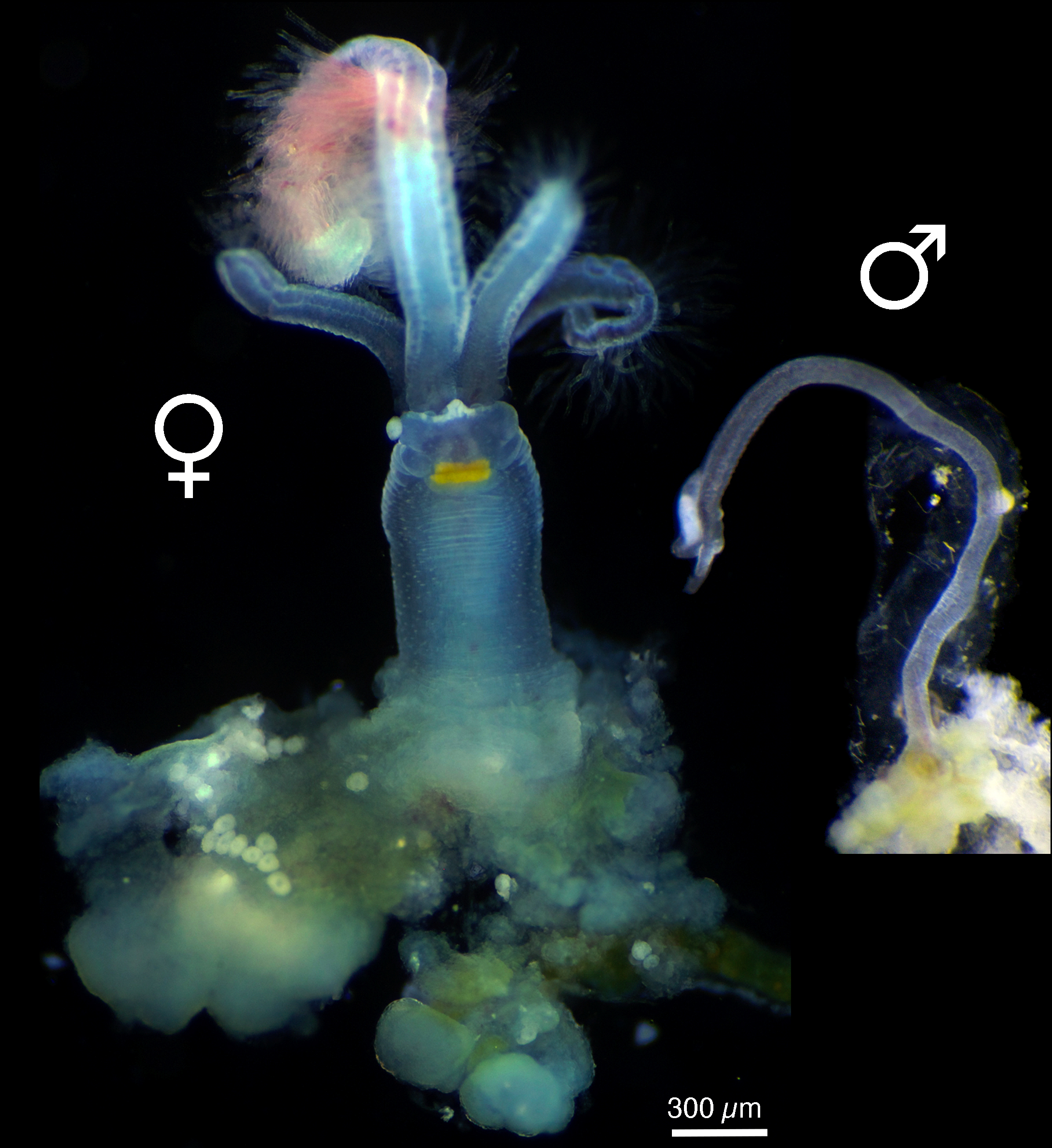
Female and male Osedax priapus showing size dimorphism but not as dramatic as in other Osedax when males are tiny dwarfs. O. priapus males are able to consume bone for their nutrition unlike all other known male Osedax.

Osedax priapus is a species of annelid polychaete worms that consume the nutrients inside the bones of dead whales or other vertebrates.

== Description ==
Unlike other species of Osedax, males of this species grow to full size and can feed independently of females, thus demonstrating reversal of sexual size dimorphism (SSD).

== Etymology ==
The name of O. priapus is borrowed from Priapus, the Greek god of procreation and the personification of the phallus. The genus name Osedax is Latin for 'bone-eater'.

== Anatomy ==
Like the females of other Osedax species, both sexes of O. priapus show three regions: the roots, the trunk, and the palps. The epidermis of the roots act as a 'drill' that secretes acid to burrow into the bone. The roots also contain symbiotic bacteria to absorb nutrients. This region also contains the gonads, either an ovary or testis in the case of O. priapus. The trunk is in a gelatinous tube that surrounds the main body of the worm which they can retract into. The trunk is muscular to allow the worm to pull into the tube when in danger. The palps act as gills for gas exchange. Individuals of O. priapus have a yellow patch of pigment on the prostomium, just under the palps. The males have been shown to stretch their trunk from lengths of 2 mm to 15 mm.

The female worms have an ovisac below the trunk, and an oviduct among the four palps, like the females of other Osedax species. They tend to be smaller than other species on average, with other O. priapus males still being one-third of their size.

The O. priapus males have testis sacs surrounded by the roots and a sperm duct connected to a seminal vesicle that opens just below the palps. The males have two palps rather than four, possibly to allow efficient sperm transfer.

== Reproduction ==
Due to the males of O. priapus still resembling other Osedax species, they use their seminal vesicle on the head to store free sperm for mating with the females. The free sperm doesn't swim well through the sea water, meaning that males need to directly transfer the sperm. To accomplish this, the male worm uses their extremely extendable trunks to locate female worms within reach and get in contact with them to perform sperm transfer.

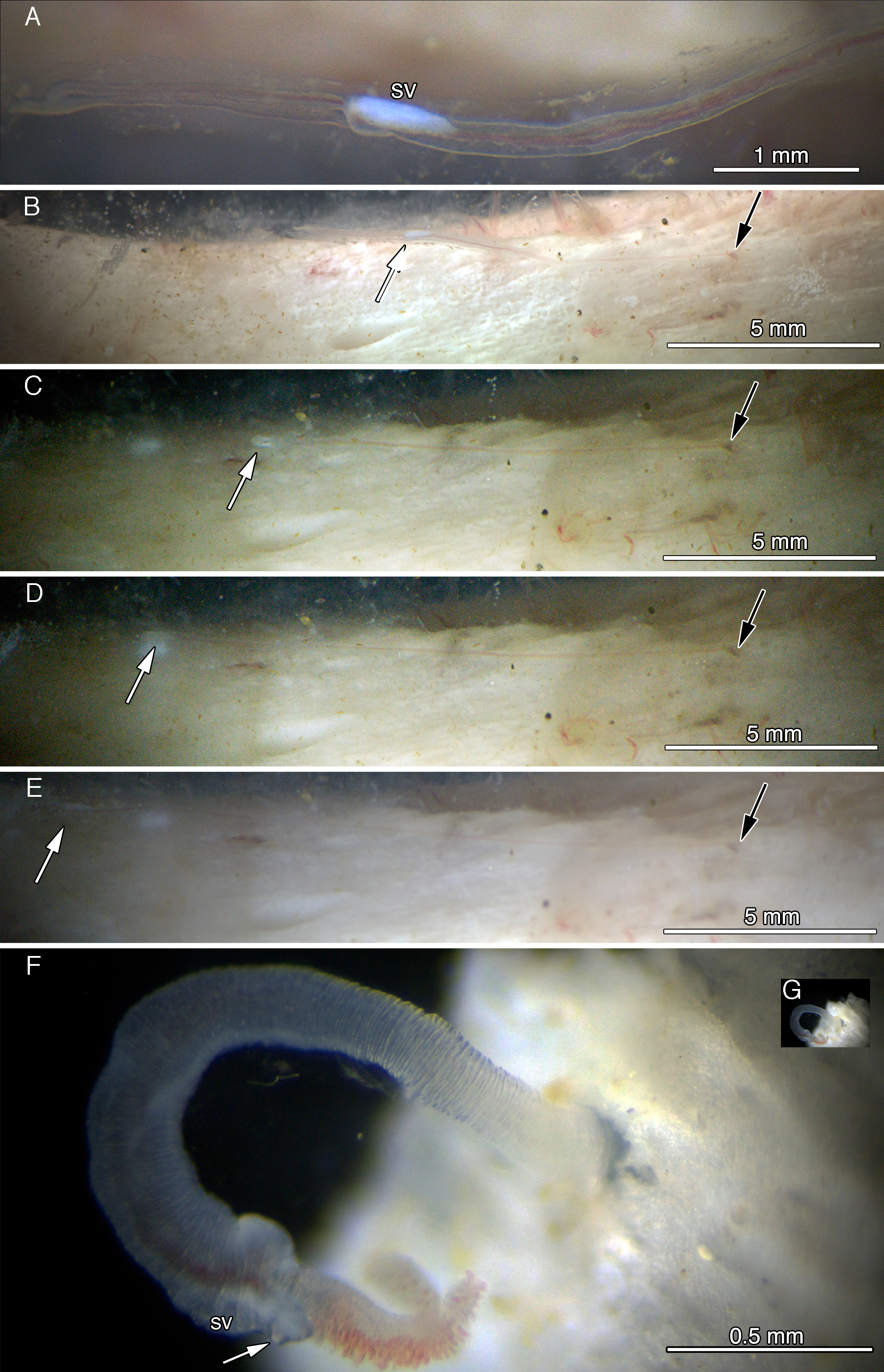
Males of Osedax priapus must roam the bone to find females to mate with. They do this by extending their trunks markedly as shown in B-E, while G shows the retracted male size at the same scale. The seminal vesicle (SV) is where the sperm is stored to transfer to the female.

== Advantages ==
In other Osedax species, the sexual size dimorphism eliminated competition between male and female worms for limited resources like food or space. If there isn't competition over resources, the females in the species grow bigger and the amount of offspring they could have increases.

In O. priapus, the males may eat bone and grow to sizes similar to that of the females (though still much smaller) because they are smaller than other Osedax species and exploit smaller bones on the seafloor. Other species with larger growing females can rapidly colonize a bone, leaving nowhere else to land but other worms' plumes. Osedax priapus has more room on the bone to colonize, allowing the evolution of bone-feeding males.

Along with less competition, as a mature worm feeding off of the bones, an O. priapus male can continuously make sperm, rather than the microscopic males of other species that are limited by the nutrients provided by a maternal yolk supply. If O. priapus males were to depend on such maternal yolk, they would not be able to produce much sperm as the eggs are much smaller than those of other Osedax. This species also has access to many more female worms who wouldn't need to take in larvae to host groups of males. The problem for the males is that they are stuck in the bone and must make contact with a female, hence the very extendable trunk.
