= Osedax mucofloris =

Scientific classification
- Kingdom: Animalia
- Phylum: Annelida
- Clade: Pleistoannelida
- Clade: Sedentaria
- Order: Sabellida
- Family: Siboglinidae
- Genus: Osedax
- Species: O. mucofloris

Binomial name
- Osedax mucofloris Glover, Kallstrom, Smith & Dahlgren, 2005

Species of annelid worm

Osedax mucofloris is a species of bathypelagic Polychaetes that is reported to sustain itself on the bones of dead whales. Translated from the mixed Greek and Latin used in scientific names, Osedax mucofloris literally means "snot-flower bone-eater", though the less-accurate "bone-eating snot-flower worm" seems to be the form actually used. The species is found in North East Atlantic where it is abundant. Osedax mucofloris have special root tissues that they use to pierce into the whale bones found on the seafloor. Through computed tomography (CT) findings, over an 8-month period, a dense population of Osedax mucofloris had a maximum penetration of 2.63 mm, roughly 0.67% of the bone. Although the patterns and mechanisms of this piercing, known as boring, is poorly understood, there is evidence that Osedax mucofloris have acidic mucopolysaccharides in the mucus of their root tissues that aids in the mechanism of boring through bones.
