= Endozoicomonas numazuensis =

Scientific classification
- Domain: Bacteria
- Kingdom: Pseudomonadati
- Phylum: Pseudomonadota
- Class: Gammaproteobacteria
- Order: Oceanospirillales
- Family: Endozoicomonadaceae
- Genus: Endozoicomonas
- Species: E. numazuensis

Binomial name
- Endozoicomonas numazuensis Nishijima et al. 2013

Type strain
- DSM 25634, HC50, NBRC 108893

Species of bacterium

Endozoicomonas numazuensis is a rod-shaped, facultatively anaerobic and non-motile bacterium from the genus Endozoicomonas which has been isolated from a marine sponge from Numazu in Japan.
