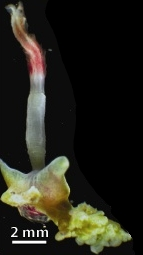
- Osedax roseus

Scientific classification
- Kingdom: Animalia
- Phylum: Annelida
- Clade: Pleistoannelida
- Clade: Sedentaria
- Order: Sabellida
- Family: Siboglinidae
- Genus: Osedax
- Species: O. roseus

Binomial name
- Osedax roseus Rouse, Worsaae, Johnson, Jones & Vrijenhoek, 2008

= Osedax roseus =

Species of annelid worm

Osedax roseus is a species of bathypelagic polychaete worm that lives at abyssal depths and is able to sustain itself on the bones of dead whales. The species is found in the North East Pacific.

== Behavior ==
When a whale dies, its carcass falls to the seabed. Here it provides a feast for many deep-sea invertebrates. Worms such as Osedax roseus make use of the bones when only the skeleton remains. The worms produce a branching network of "roots" which house symbiotic bacteria which enable the worms to utilise the bones' nutrient content.

This worm was first described from a whale carcase that fell to the seabed in Monterey Bay, California, settling at a depth of 1,018 m (3,340 ft). Time lapse photography shows that female Osedax roseus were present on the remains of the carcase two months later and that they were fecund three months after that. These worms are sexually dimorphic, the male and female forms being markedly different. The females are large and the males are microscopic and live inside the parchment-like tubes which the female worms create. The authors of this study hypothesise that the sex of an egg may be determined by environmental factors, all eggs hatching near a new carcase being females, but these being heavily outnumbered by males at a later stage. This allows the females to produce many fertilised eggs which are able to disperse widely across the ocean. Few of these will land close enough to a sunken carcase to be able to develop into adult worms.
