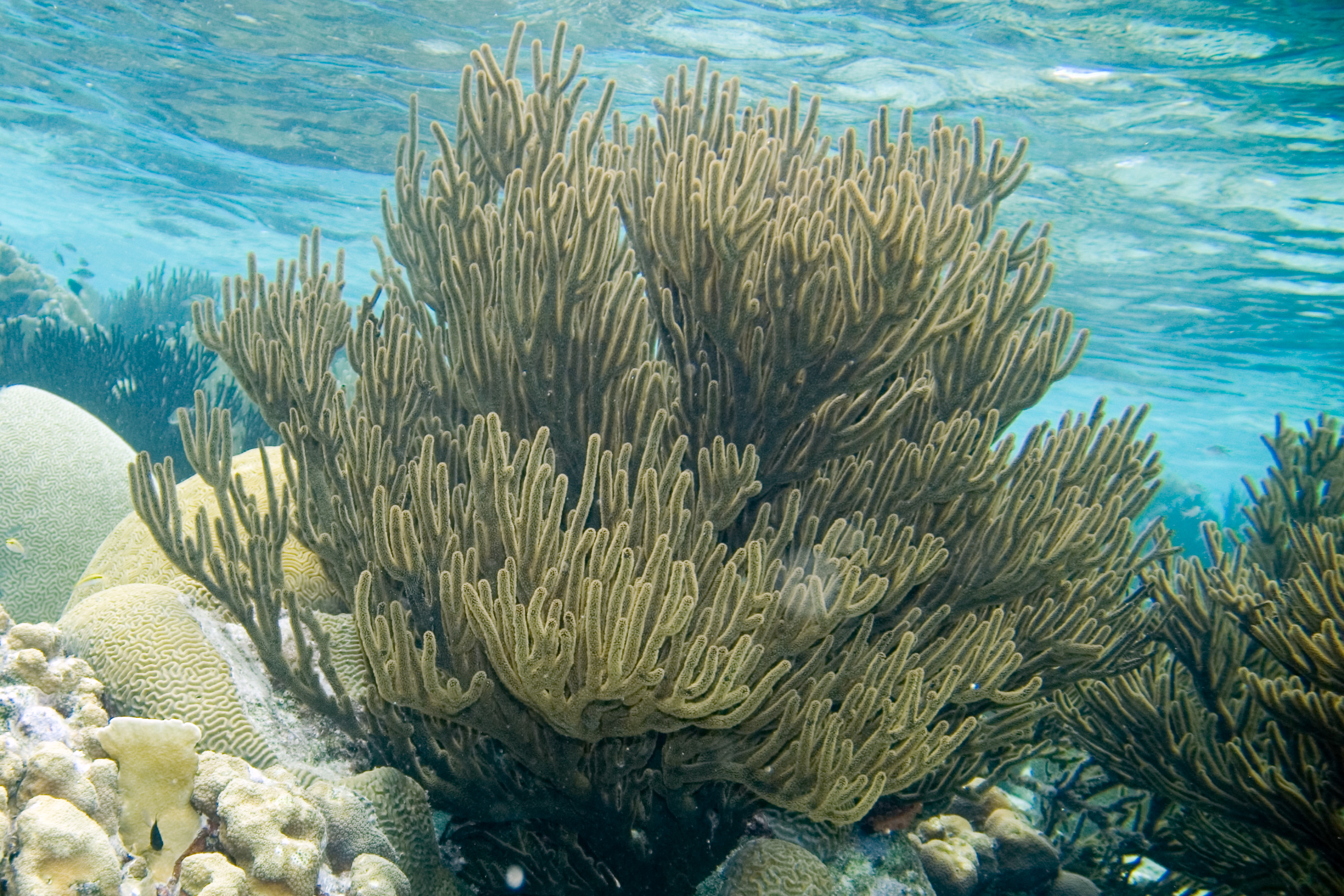

Scientific classification
- Kingdom: Animalia
- Phylum: Cnidaria
- Subphylum: Anthozoa
- Class: Octocorallia
- Order: Malacalcyonacea
- Family: Plexauridae
- Genus: Plexaura
- Species: P. homomalla

Binomial name
- Plexaura homomalla (Esper, 1792)

= Plexaura homomalla =

Species of coral

Plexaura homomalla, commonly known as the black sea rod or Caribbean sea whip, is a species of gorgonian-type octocoral in the family Plexauridae. It is widely distributed in the Caribbean from the Florida Keys to the northern coast of Venezuela. P. homomalla contains the bioactive lipid prostaglandin A_{2} 15-acetate methyl ester at about 3% of total wet weight.

== Description ==
P. homomalla forms a bushy or candelabra-like colony of upright branches. It has a tendency to branch in a single plane with a few dichotomous forks, but mostly bears lateral branches. It grows to a height of about 35 cm (14 in) and has two forms; P. h. forma kuekenthali is taller and slimmer, with narrow terminal branches, and P. h. forma homomalla is shorter with more robust terminal branches. The central stalk and branches are black or dark brown, and the polyps are cream-coloured, yellow, or pale brown. The calyces from which the polyps protrude are typically not projecting, but may be slightly raised above the surface of the coral.

== Distribution ==
P. homomalla is found growing on reefs in the Caribbean Sea, the Gulf of Mexico, the Bahamas, and Florida. It grows at depths down to about 55 m (180 ft) with P. h.forma homomalla being more abundant in shallow waters and P. h.forma kuekenthali occurring mostly at greater depths.

== Ecology ==
P. homomalla contains a high level of the lipid prostaglandin A. This physiologically active substance is a million times more abundant in its tissues than in those of most other animals. The function of this large amount of prostaglandin in the coral is unknown. Its function in mammals is to act as a muscle relaxant. It is used to induce labour and it causes nausea and vomiting. P. homomalla contains 2 to 3% by weight of prostaglandin and was used as a source for the drug until methods for its synthesis became available in the 1970s. Killifish, family Cyprinodontidae, and yellowhead wrasse (Halichoeres garnoti) vomit after being fed gelatine pellets containing prostaglandin. In feeding trials, the fish quickly learned to avoid these pellets while accepting control pellets. The prostaglandin produced by the coral seems to offer a chemical defence and act as a deterrent to predatory fishes.
