= Marinomonas =

Scientific classification
- Domain: Bacteria
- Kingdom: Pseudomonadati
- Phylum: Pseudomonadota
- Class: Gammaproteobacteria
- Order: Oceanospirillales
- Family: Oceanospirillaceae
- Genus: Marinomonas van Landschoot and De Ley 1984

Type species
- Marinomonas communis

Species
- M. alcarazii M. aquimarina M. aquiplantarum M. arctica M. arenicola M. atlantica M. balearica M. blandensis M. brasilensis M. communis M. dokdonensis M. foliarum M. fungiae M. gallaica M. hwangdonensis M. mangrovi M. mediterranea M. ostreistagni M. polaris M. pollencensis M. pontica M. posidonica M. primoryensis M. profundimaris M. rhizomae M. spartinae M. ushuaiensis M. vaga

Genus of bacteria

Marinomonas is an aerobic bacteria genus from the family of Oceanospirillaceae.
