= Amphritea =

Scientific classification
- Domain: Bacteria
- Kingdom: Pseudomonadati
- Phylum: Pseudomonadota
- Class: Gammaproteobacteria
- Order: Oceanospirillales
- Family: Oceanospirillaceae
- Genus: Amphritea; Gärtner et al. 2008

Type species
- Amphritea atlantica

Species
- Amphritea atlantica Amphritea balenae Amphritea ceti Amphritea japonica Amphritea opalescens

Genus of bacteria

Amphritea is a bacterial genus from the family Oceanospirillaceae.
