= Endozoicomonas elysicola =

Scientific classification
- Domain: Bacteria
- Kingdom: Pseudomonadati
- Phylum: Pseudomonadota
- Class: Gammaproteobacteria
- Order: Oceanospirillales
- Family: Endozoicomonadaceae
- Genus: Endozoicomonas
- Species: E. elysicola

Binomial name
- Endozoicomonas elysicola Kurahashi and Yokota 2007

Synonyms
- Elysiobacter vulgo Endozoicimonas elysicola

Species of bacterium

Endozoicomonas elysicola is a Gram-negative, rod-shaped and strictly aerobic bacterium from the genus Endozoicomonas which has been isolated from the gastrointestinal tract of the sea slug Elysia ornata from the coast of Izu-Miyake Island in Japan.
