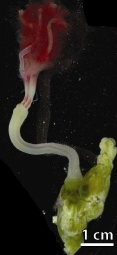

Scientific classification
- Kingdom: Animalia
- Phylum: Annelida
- Clade: Pleistoannelida
- Clade: Sedentaria
- Order: Sabellida
- Family: Siboglinidae
- Genus: Osedax
- Species: O. rubiplumus

Binomial name
- Osedax rubiplumus Rouse, Goffredi & Vrijenhoek, 2004

= Osedax rubiplumus =

Species of annelid

Osedax rubiplumus is a species of bathypelagic Polychaetes that is reported to sustain itself on the bones of dead whales.

== Description ==
Their paedomorphic males are 0.4–1.1 millimetres (0.016–0.043 in), and have an incompleted prototroch with a posterior hooked chaeta. The species have 16 hooks with 6-8 capitium teeth, which have handles that are 18–23 micrometres (0.00071–0.00091 in). The female ovisac is measured 8 mm by 4 mm by 0.3 mm, with four posterior roots which have spherical lobes. They also have a trunk which is 3.8 centimetres (1.5 in) in length and 2 millimetres (0.079 in) wide with the crown plumes which are 2.1 centimetres (0.83 in) in length. The species is found in East North Pacific where it is abundant. They are used in Calmodulin.
