= Endozoicomonas montiporae =

Scientific classification
- Domain: Bacteria
- Kingdom: Pseudomonadati
- Phylum: Pseudomonadota
- Class: Gammaproteobacteria
- Order: Oceanospirillales
- Family: Endozoicomonadaceae
- Genus: Endozoicomonas
- Species: E. montiporae

Binomial name
- Endozoicomonas montiporae Yang et al. 2010

Type strain
- BCRC 17933, CL-33, LMG 24815

Species of bacterium

Endozoicomonas montiporae is a Gram-negative, rod-shaped and aerobic bacterium from the genus Endozoicomonas which has been isolated from the coral Montipora aequituberculata.
