= Osedax japonicus =

Scientific classification
- Domain: Eukaryota
- Kingdom: Animalia
- Phylum: Annelida
- Clade: Pleistoannelida
- Clade: Sedentaria
- Order: Sabellida
- Family: Siboglinidae
- Genus: Osedax
- Species: O. japonicus

Binomial name
- Osedax japonicus Fujikura, Fujiwara & Kawato, 2006

Species of annelid worm

Osedax japonicus is a species of bathypelagic polychaete tube worm that lives at great depths on the seabed and is able to sustain itself on the bones of a dead whale. It was first described in 2006 from a sunken sperm whale carcase near Kyushu, Japan.

== Discovery ==
Scientists from the Monterey Bay Aquarium Research Institute using the submarine ROV Tiburon first discovered worms of the genus Osedax in Monterey Bay, California, in February 2002. The worms were found living on the bones of a decaying gray whale in the Monterey Canyon, at a depth of 2,893 m (9,491 ft). The discovery caused great excitement among marine biologists, and since then other species of worms of the same genus have been discovered on whale carcases lying in deep water in other parts of the world. Osedax japonicus was first described in 2006 from a sperm whale carcase that fell to the seabed off Kyushu, Japan, settling at a depth of 200 m (656 ft). Numerous female tube worms were observed but no males were seen.

== Description ==
An adult worm has a ringlike crown of feathery plumes which are involved in respiration, a trunk and a rooting structure which contains symbiotic bacteria. It has no digestive system nor a segmental structure as do most worms.

== Behaviour ==
When a whale dies, its carcass falls to the seabed. Here it provides a feast for many deep-sea creatures. Worms such as Osedax japonicus make use of the bones when only the skeleton remains. The worms produce a branching network of "roots" that house symbiotic bacteria, which enable the worms to utilise the bones' nutrient content.

The reproduction of Osedax japonicus has been studied. Female worms reach maturity at about six weeks. They secrete mucus to form a tube that surrounds their trunk. Male worms are minute by comparison with the females and they take up residence inside the tubes. The females spawn eggs and retain them in the mucus where they are fertilised by the males. Here they develop for a time before they swim out of the mucus as trochophore larvae. The larvae are then planktonic and can live for at least ten days in the open sea. It seems that if they settle on a suitable vertebrate bone they will develop into female worms but if mature females are already present on the bone, they will develop into males. The vast majority will fail to find any sunken bone.
