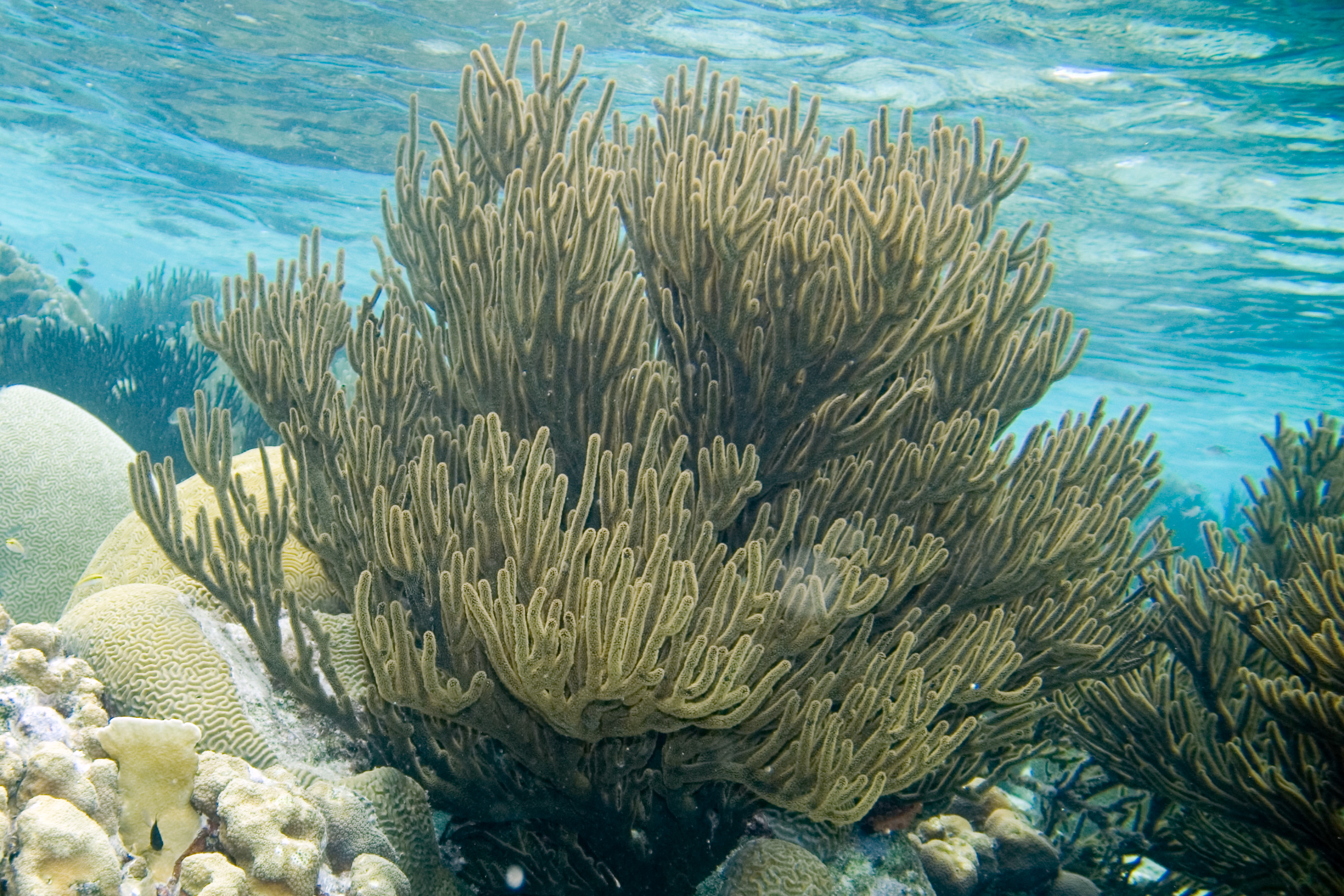
- Black sea rod (Plexaura homomalla)

Scientific classification
- Kingdom: Animalia
- Phylum: Cnidaria
- Subphylum: Anthozoa
- Class: Octocorallia
- Order: Malacalcyonacea
- Family: Plexauridae
- Genus: Plexaura; Lamouroux, 1812

Species
- See text

= Plexaura =

Genus of corals

Plexaura is a genus of gorgonian-type octocorals in the family Plexauridae.

== Medical research ==
Plexaura is a coral that has a large amount of prostaglandins making it a great natural source of a compound called Prostaglandin A2. Prostaglandins can be extracted from Plexaura using dichloromethane/methanol and a rotary evaporator.Research indicates that Prostaglandin A2 may have activity against cancer. Under laboratory conditions prostaglandin A2 was able to inhibit enzymes present in some cancer cells. Prostaglandin A2 has shown to have cytotoxic activity towards both breast cancer and lung cancer cells. Treatment with prostaglandin A2 was also found to have major benefits for lung endothelial cells. Increasing recovery rates, decreasing inflammation and enhancing the endothelial cell barrier. This compound may have the potential to help people suffering from a respiratory infection recover quicker and easier with less chance of another infection due to the strengthening of the endothelial cell barrier.

== Species ==
The World Register of Marine Species lists these species:

- Plexaura aggregata Nutting, 1910
- Plexaura arbuscula Duchassaing, 1850
- Plexaura atra (Verrill, 1901)
- Plexaura attenuata Nutting, 1910
- Plexaura capoblancoi Stiasny, 1936
- Plexaura corticosa Duchassaing & Michelotti, 1860
- Plexaura dubia Kölliker, 1865
- Plexaura edwardsi Moser, 1921
- Plexaura ehrenbergi Kölliker, 1865
- Plexaura esperi Verrill, 1907
- Plexaura flava Nutting, 1910
- Plexaura flavida (Lamarck, 1815)
- Plexaura flexuosula Kükenthal, 1917
- Plexaura fusca Duchassaing & Michelotti, 1860
- Plexaura hartmeyeri Moser, 1921
- Plexaura homomalla (Esper, 1792)
- Plexaura kukenthali Moser, 1921
- Plexaura kuna Lasker, Kim & Coffroth, 1996
- Plexaura laevigata Moser, 1921
- Plexaura miniacea Ehrenberg, 1834
- Plexaura nina Bayer & Deichmann, 1958
- Plexaura pinnata Nutting, 1910
- Plexaura porosa (Esper, 1794)
- Plexaura racemosa Valenciennes, 1855
- Plexaura ramosa Moser, 1921
- Plexaura turgida (Ehrenberg, 1834)
- Plexaura valenciennesi Wright & Studer, 1889
- Plexaura volvata Kunze, 1917
