= Oceanospirillaceae =

Scientific classification
- Domain: Bacteria
- Kingdom: Pseudomonadati
- Phylum: Pseudomonadota
- Class: Gammaproteobacteria
- Order: Oceanospirillales
- Family: Oceanospirillaceae; Garrity et al. 2005

Genera
- Amphritea; Bacterioplanes; Bacterioplanoides; Balneatrix; Bermanella; Corallomonas; Litoribacillus; Litoribrevibacter; Marinomonas; Marinospirillum; Marinobacterium; Motiliproteus; Neptuniibacter; Neptunomonas; Nitrincola; Oceaniserpentilla; Oceanospirillum; Oceanobacter; Oleispira; Profundimonas; Spongiispira; Thalassolituus

Family of bacteria

Oceanospirillaceae is a family of Pseudomonadota. Most genera in this family live in environments with high concentrations of salt; they are halotolerant or halophilic. They are marine, except Balneatrix which is found in fresh water and Venatorbacter, which is from terrestrial origin. All members are strictly aerobic, except Neptunomonas which can perform fermentation reactions.
