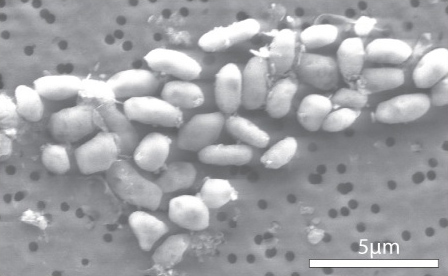

Scientific classification
- Domain: Bacteria
- Kingdom: Pseudomonadati
- Phylum: Pseudomonadota
- Class: Gammaproteobacteria
- Order: Oceanospirillales

Families
- Alcanivoracaceae; Balneatrichaceae; Endozoicomonadaceae; Hahellaceae; Halomonadaceae; Kangiellaceae; Litoricolaceae; Oceanospirillaceae; Oleiphilaceae; Saccharospirillaceae

= Oceanospirillales =

Order of bacteria

The Oceanospirillales are an order of Pseudomonadota with ten families.

== Description ==
Bacteria in the Oceanospirillales are metabolically and morphologically diverse, with some able to grow in the presence of oxygen and others requiring an anaerobic environment. Members of the Oceanospirillales can be halotolerant or halophilic and require high salt concentrations to grow. While they grow in diverse niches, all Oceanospirillales derive their energy from the breakdown of various organic products. Bacteria in the Oceanospirillales are motile except for those in the genus Alcanivorax. Bacteria in the Oceanospirillales include hydrocarbon-degrading groups such as Oleispira antarctica, Thalassolituus oleivorans, and Oleiphilus messinensis, which were found in the indigenous microbial community in deep waters after the Deepwater Horizon oil spill in 2010. They are also common members of bacterial communities in the water column of the hadal zone of ocean trenches.

== History ==
The order Oceanospirillales was first described in 2005 in the second edition of Bergey's Manual of Systematic Bacteriology, consisting of six families and with the type genus of Oceanospirillum. In 2007, a seventh family was added with the identification of Litoricola lipolytica and the creation of its family Litoricolaceae.
