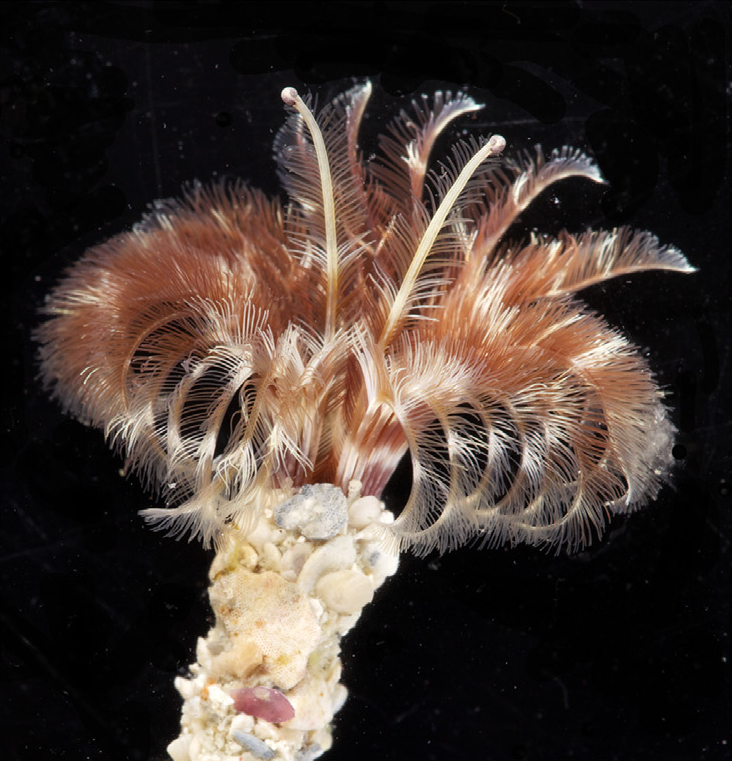

Scientific classification
- Kingdom: Animalia
- Phylum: Annelida
- Clade: Pleistoannelida
- Clade: Sedentaria
- Order: Sabellida
- Family: Sabellidae
- Genus: Acromegalomma
- Species: A. interruptum

Binomial name
- Acromegalomma interruptum (Capa & Murray, 2009)

= Acromegalomma interruptum =

Species of annelid

Acromegalomma interruptum is a bristle worm from the Sabellidae family. The body of the worm consists of a head, a cylindrical, segmented body and a tailpiece. The head consists of a prostomium (part for the mouth opening) and a peristomium (part around the mouth) and carries paired appendages (palps, antennae and cirri).

== Etymology and genus name ==
The name A. interruptum refers to the interrupted arrangement of the eyes on the radioles. Acromegalomma interruptum was originally called Megalomma interrupta, however Megalomma is already the name of a genus of beetles, which was described before. Therefore the genus in the family Sabellidae was renamed to Acromegalomma.
