= Biomineralizing polychaete =

Polychaetes that produce minerals

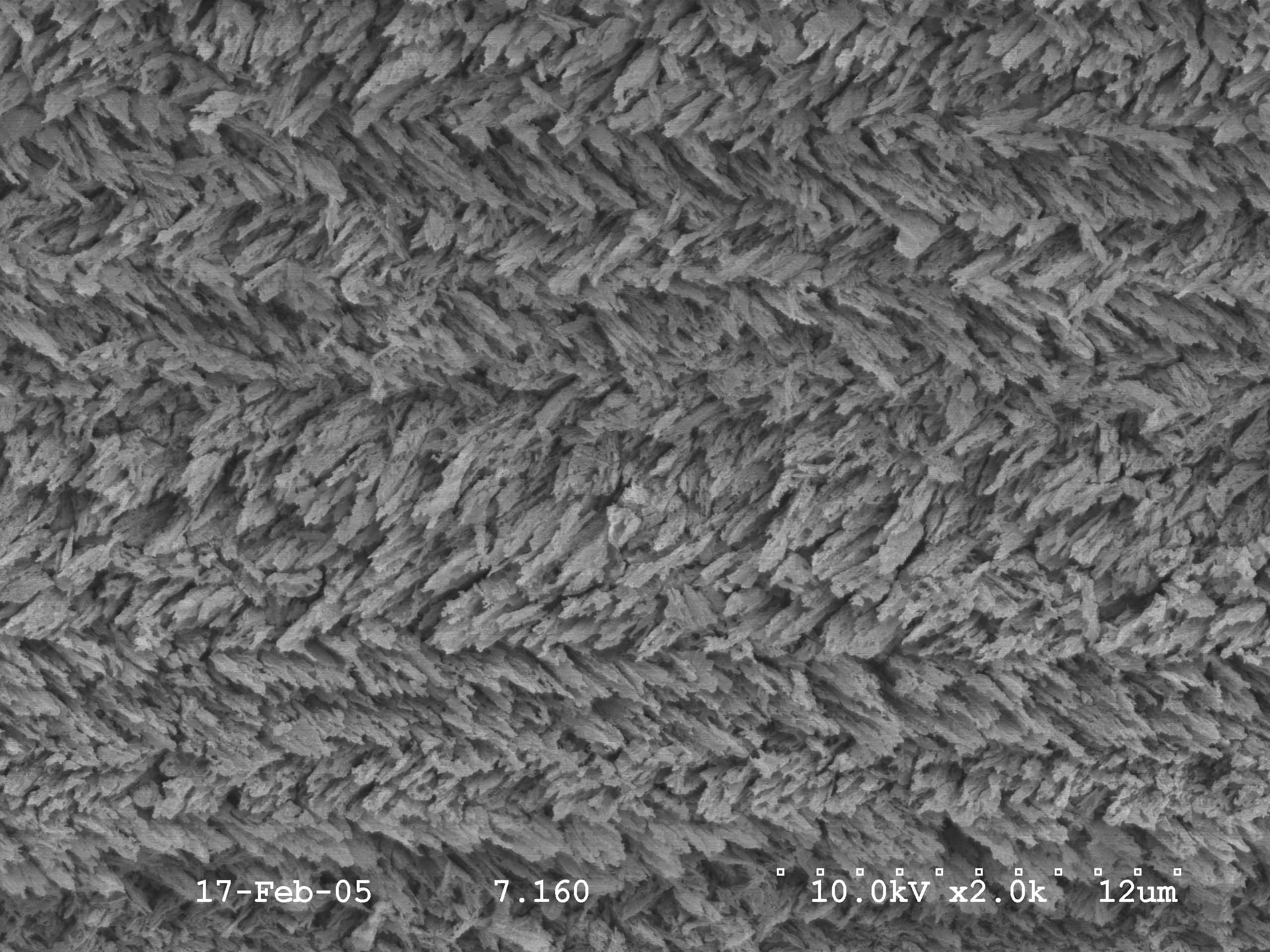
Serpula israelitica, longitudinal section of the tube, calcitic lamello-fibrillar structure

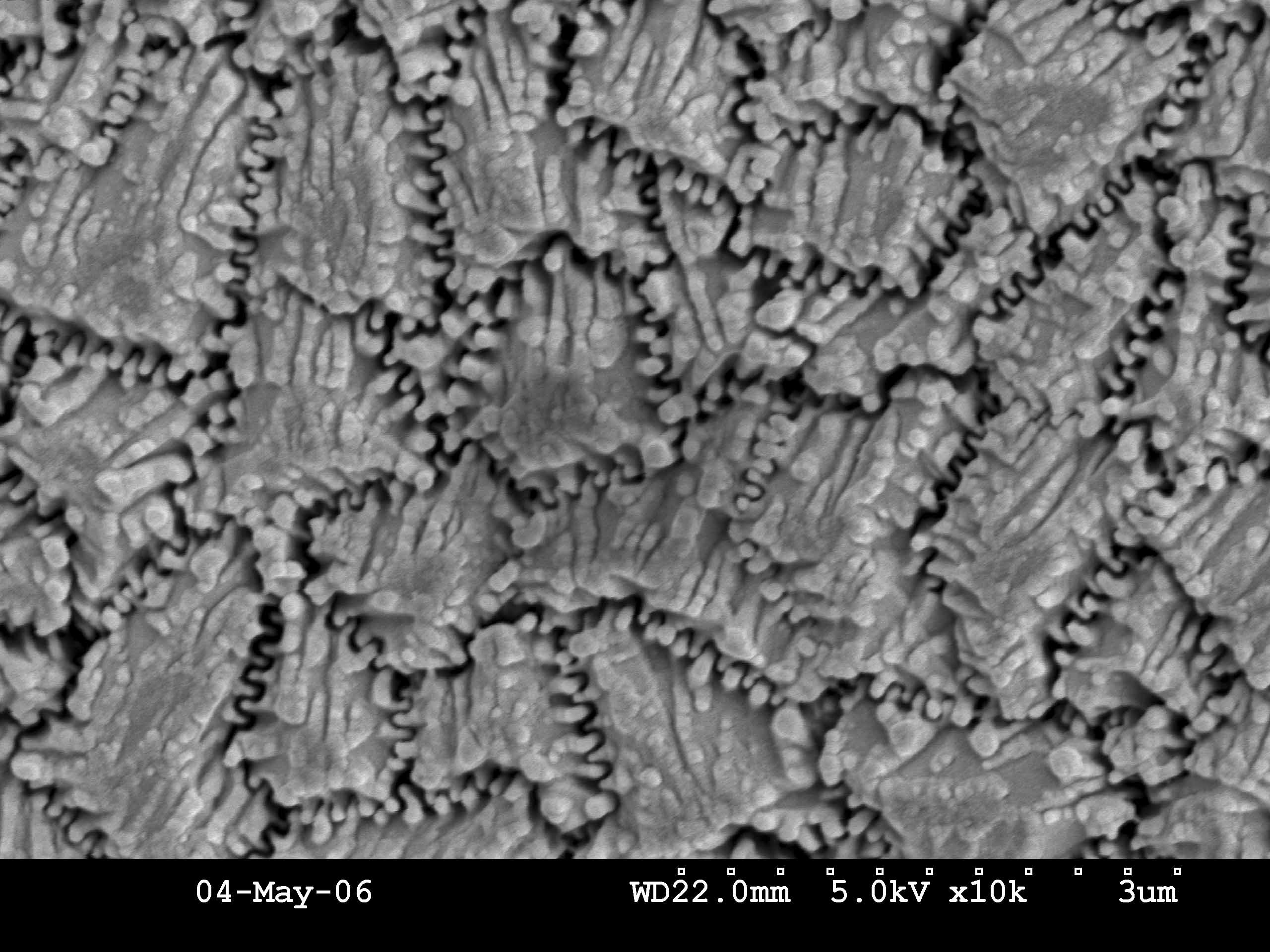
Ditrupa arietina (Serpulidae), outer tube layer, calcitic regularly ridged prismatic structure, showing interlocked prisms

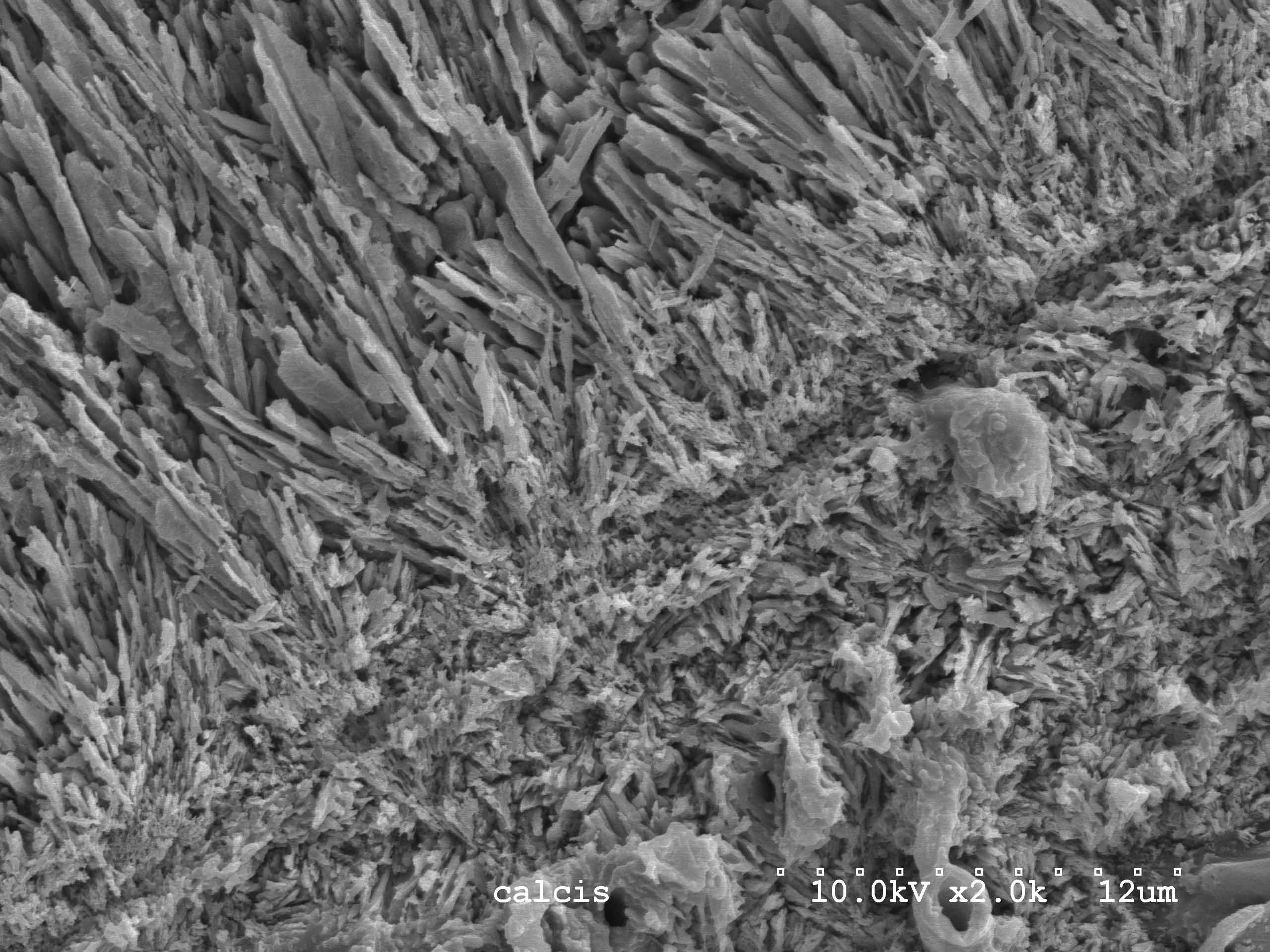
Glomerula piloseta (Sabellidae), longitudinal section of the tube, aragonitic spherulitic prismatic structure

Biomineralizing polychaetes are polychaetes that produce minerals to harden or stiffen their own tissues (biomineralize).

The most important biomineralizing polychaetes are serpulids, sabellids and cirratulids. They secrete tubes of calcium carbonate. Serpulids have most advanced biomineralization system among the annelids. Serpulids possess very diverse tube ultrastructures. Serpulid tubes are composed of aragonite, calcite or mixture of both polymorphs. In addition to the tubes, some serpulid species secrete calcareous opercula. Some sabellids and cirratulids can secrete aragonitic tubes. Sabellid and cirratulid tubes have a spherulitic prismatic ultrastructure. There are thin organic sheets in serpulid tube mineral structures. These sheets have evolved as an adaptation to strengthen the mechanical properties of the tubes. Fossil and present-day cirratulid bioconstructors have been confirmed to be the only known occurrence of double-phased biomineralization processes in the animal kingdom.
