= Branchiomma luctuosum =

- Branchiomma luctuosum from La Seyne-sur-Mer, France

Scientific classification
- Kingdom: Animalia
- Phylum: Annelida
- Clade: Pleistoannelida
- Clade: Sedentaria
- Order: Sabellida
- Family: Sabellidae
- Genus: Branchiomma
- Species: B. luctuosum

Binomial name
- Branchiomma luctuosum (Grube, 1870)

Species of feather duster worm

Branchiomma luctuosum is a species of marine annelid in the feather duster worm family, Sabellidae. The worm has become invasive across the Atlantic Ocean, Mediterranean Sea, and the Pacific Ocean.

== Description ==
Branchiomma luctuosum is a tube dwelling worm that grows up to about 190 mm in length. The grooved body is green or brown with small dark spots speckled across. Similar to other feather duster worms, the brachial crown of B. luctuosum is made of large, feather-like tentacles. The brachial crown has an orange or red color that is typically around 24 mm but can grow up to 30 mm. The brachial crown is made up of 18 to 29 pairs of spiraled radioles that are fused together with a basement membrane.

== Distribution ==
Branchiomma luctuosum was first described in the Red Sea, and is considered native to the sea. Since the late 1970s, B. luctuosum has been described across the Mediterranean Sea. The worm was first described as a non-native species in Italy, and has since been found along the coasts of Cyprus, Greece, Spain, Turkey, and Albania. Outside of the Mediterranean, it has been found along both sides of the Atlantic Sea, off the coasts of Brazil and Angola. In 2026, the worm was described in Japan, the first known presence of the species in the Pacific Ocean. Thought it has also been found off of Pakistan, it is unknown whether B. luctuosum should be considered native in the area.

It is thought that B. luctuosum has been able to spread outside of its native range by traveling in the ballast water of boats, especially while in its larval pelagic form. The spread has been especially aided by boating through the Suez Canal that connects the Mediterranean Sea to the Red Sea.

== Biology ==
Branchiomma luctuosum is a simultaneous hermaphrodite, meaning that an individual produces male and female gametes at the same time. When developing, the worm has a short pelagic larval period compared to other sabellids. These factors are thought to be why B. luctuosum has been a successful invasive species.
