= Schizobranchia insignis =

Scientific classification
- Kingdom: Animalia
- Phylum: Annelida
- Clade: Pleistoannelida
- Clade: Sedentaria
- Order: Sabellida
- Family: Sabellidae
- Genus: Schizobranchia
- Species: S. insignis

Binomial name
- Schizobranchia insignis Bush, 1905

Species of annelid worm

Schizobranchia insignis is a marine feather duster worm. It may be commonly known as the split-branch feather duster, split-plume feather duster, and the feather duster worm. It may be found from Alaska to Central California, living on pilings and rocks, intertidal to 46 m. It is particularly abundant on the underside of wharves in Puget Sound, Washington, and on wharves at Boston Harbor marina.

Specimens of S. insignis are generally 10–20 cm long, and 5–10 mm in diameter, with tubes which are whitish and pliable. The tentacular crown is uniform orange, red, mauve, tan, brown, grey, or green in color. Among sabellids of the Pacific Northwest, S. insignis is unique in that all radioles are dichotomously branched at least once. Radioles of Eudistylia polymorpha are not branched, and only a few of the radioles of E. vancouveri are branched.

== Life history ==
Schizobranchia insignis is free-spawning, releasing gametes into the water column for fertilization. If disturbed by touch, water movement, or shadow, the tentacular crown can be quickly withdrawn entirely within the tube, by retractor muscles. Ciliated radioles (feathery tentacles) collect planktonic particles, which are trapped in mucus and carried to the mouth.

== Physiology and biochemistry ==
Schizobranchia insignis has been found to accumulate dissolved carbon exuded by an alga. For feeding and respiration, S. insignis reportedly passes 70 ml/h/g animal (fresh weight) of water through the tentacular crown by the cilia's movement. The hooked setae of Schizobranchia insignis have been found to dig into the tube wall and serve as anchors, likely to secure the worm from being sucked out by a fish or pulled by wave action. Worms were found to withstand high pressures of 100-200 kPa (applied experimentally, from posterior).

== Ecosystem role ==
Along with other species of polychaete worms, S. insignis is host to kleptoparasitic suspension-feeding snails, like Trichotropis cancellata, that live on the worms and steal food.

== References and more information ==
- Brusca, R.C. & G.J. Brusca, 2003. Invertebrates. Sinauer Associates, Inc, Sunderland, Massachusetts.
- Kozloff, E. N., 1996. Marine Invertebrates of the Pacific Northwest. University of Washington Press, Seattle, Washington.
- Kozloff, E. N., 2000. Seashore Life of the Northern Pacific Coast. University of Washington Press, Seattle, Washington.
- Lamb, A. & Hanby, B.P., 2005. Marine Life of the Pacific Northwest: a photographic encyclopedia. Harbour Publishing, British Columbia.
