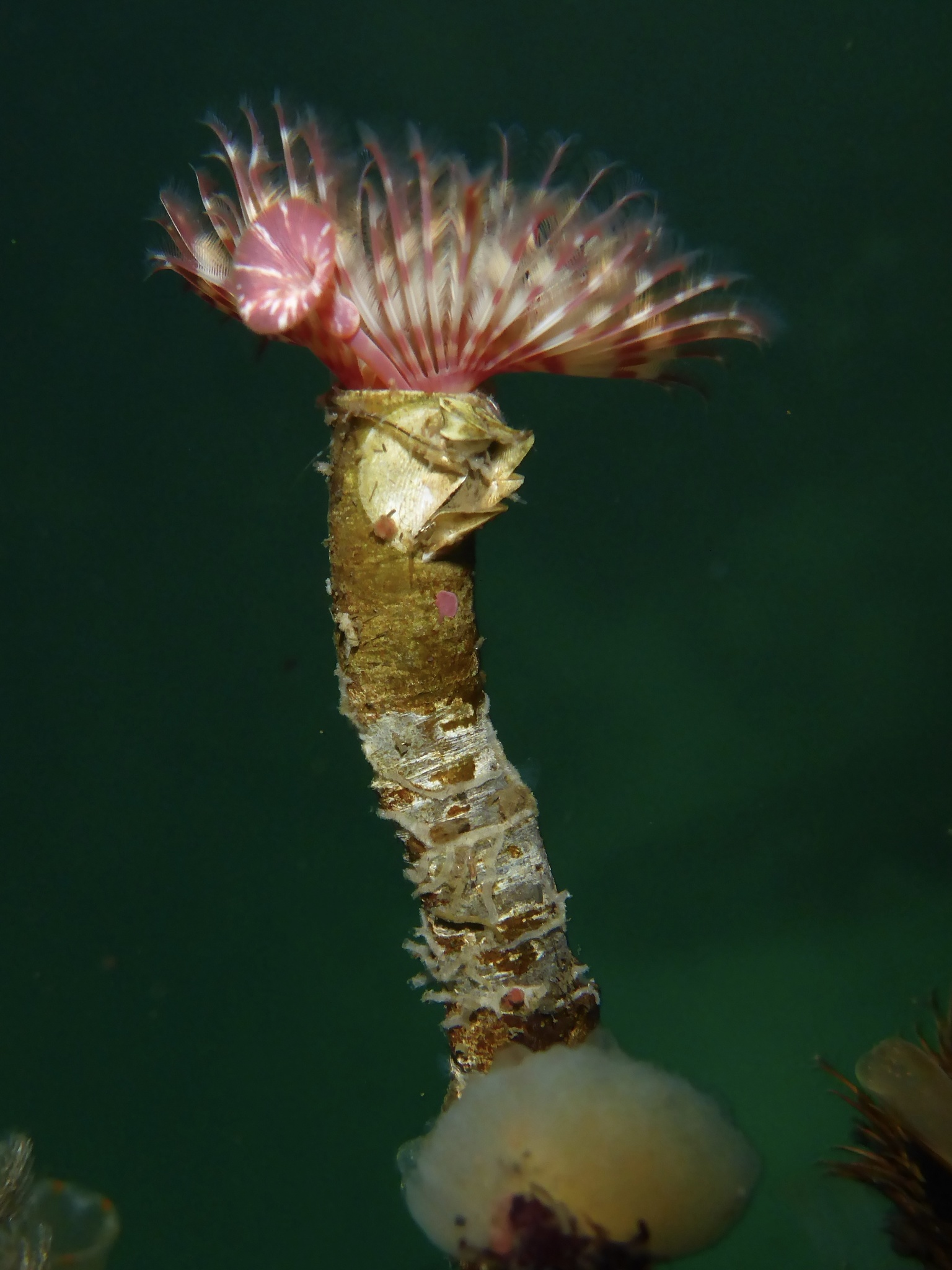

Scientific classification
- Kingdom: Animalia
- Phylum: Annelida
- Clade: Pleistoannelida
- Clade: Sedentaria
- Order: Sabellida
- Family: Serpulidae
- Genus: Serpula
- Species: S. columbiana

Binomial name
- Serpula columbiana Johnson, 1901

Synonyms
- Serpula nannoides Chamberlin, 1919; Serpula splendens Bush, 1905

= Serpula columbiana =

Species of annelid worm

Serpula columbiana, variously called the calcareous tubeworm, plume worm, fan worm, limy tube worm and red tube worm, is a species of segmented marine polychaete worm in the family Serpulidae. It is a cosmopolitan species that is found in most seas in the Northern Hemisphere including the Atlantic Ocean, the Pacific Ocean and the Indian Ocean.

== Description ==
This worm lives in an irregularly coiled, smooth, calcareous tube that it secretes and which is attached to the substrate along most of its length. The opening of the tube is protected by a funnel-shaped operculum which has about 160 tiny creases along its rim. Inside the tube, the worm is yellowish and up to 8 cm (3 in) long. It has about forty radioles (featherlike structures forming a crown) which can be extended through the open end of the tube. The operculum is usually red and the radioles are red, pink or orange and usually banded with white. The radioles are attached to the peristomium, which bears a pair of eyes, and the worm has seven thoracic segments and up to 190 abdominal segments.

== Distribution and habitat ==
Serpula columbiana has a cosmopolitan distribution in the Northern Hemisphere being present in the Indian Ocean, the Pacific Ocean, the Atlantic Ocean, the North Sea and the Mediterranean Sea. In the Pacific Ocean its range extends from the Bering Strait to Japan and from Alaska to Baja California. It is found on hard substrates such as rocks, wharves, pilings and floats, from the intertidal zone down to depths of around 100 m (300 ft).

== Ecology ==
This worm is a filter feeder and extends its radioles into the water to catch planktonic food particles. If danger threatens, the radioles can be retracted rapidly and the operculum closed to seal the tube. The worm's heart pumps blood into the radioles which also act as gills. The haemal system consists of a single branchial vessel in each radiole into which blood flows; there is no circulation and the blood flows alternately in and out in a tidal manner. In the blood, oxygen is carried by the pigment chlorocruorin. This pigment has a particular affinity for carbon monoxide, and it has been noted that the worm's larvae sometimes settle and grow on such brown seaweeds as Fucus but do not do so on Nereocystis; the suggested explanation for this is that Nereocystis uses carbon monoxide to inflate its pneumatocyst (float chambers) and that would likely make the seaweed toxic to the worm.
