= Schizobranchia =

Scientific classification
- Domain: Eukaryota
- Kingdom: Animalia
- Phylum: Annelida
- Clade: Pleistoannelida
- Clade: Sedentaria
- Order: Sabellida
- Family: Sabellidae
- Subfamily: Sabellinae
- Genus: Schizobranchia; Bush, 1905

Species
- Schizobranchia affinis; Schizobranchia dubia; Schizobranchia insignis

Genus of annelid worms

Schizobranchia is a genus of marine feather duster worm. It is closely related to Pseudopotamilla and Eudistylia, and is distinguished by its dichotomously branched radioles.
