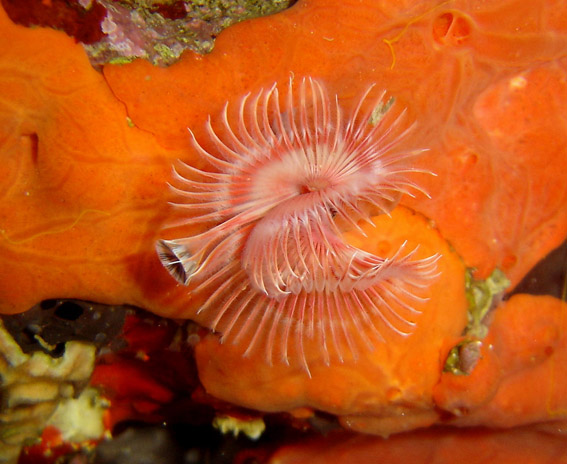

Scientific classification
- Kingdom: Animalia
- Phylum: Annelida
- Clade: Pleistoannelida
- Clade: Sedentaria
- Order: Sabellida
- Family: Serpulidae
- Genus: Serpula
- Species: S. vermicularis

Binomial name
- Serpula vermicularis Linnaeus, 1767

Synonyms
- Serpula (Serpula) aspera Philippi, 1844; S. aspera Philippi, 1844; S. crater Claparède, 1870; S. cristata Sowerby & Sowerby, 1820–25; S. echinata Gmelin, 1791; S. fascicularis Lamarck, 1818; S. gervaisii Quatrefages, 1866; S. interrupta Quatrefages, 1866; S. montagui Quatrefages, 1866; S. pallida Philippi, 1844; S. philippii Mörch, 1863; S. proboscidea (Bruguière, 1789); S. rugosa Turton, 1819; S. venusta Philippi, 1844; Vermilia vermicularis Fleming, 1825

= Serpula vermicularis =

Species of annelid worm

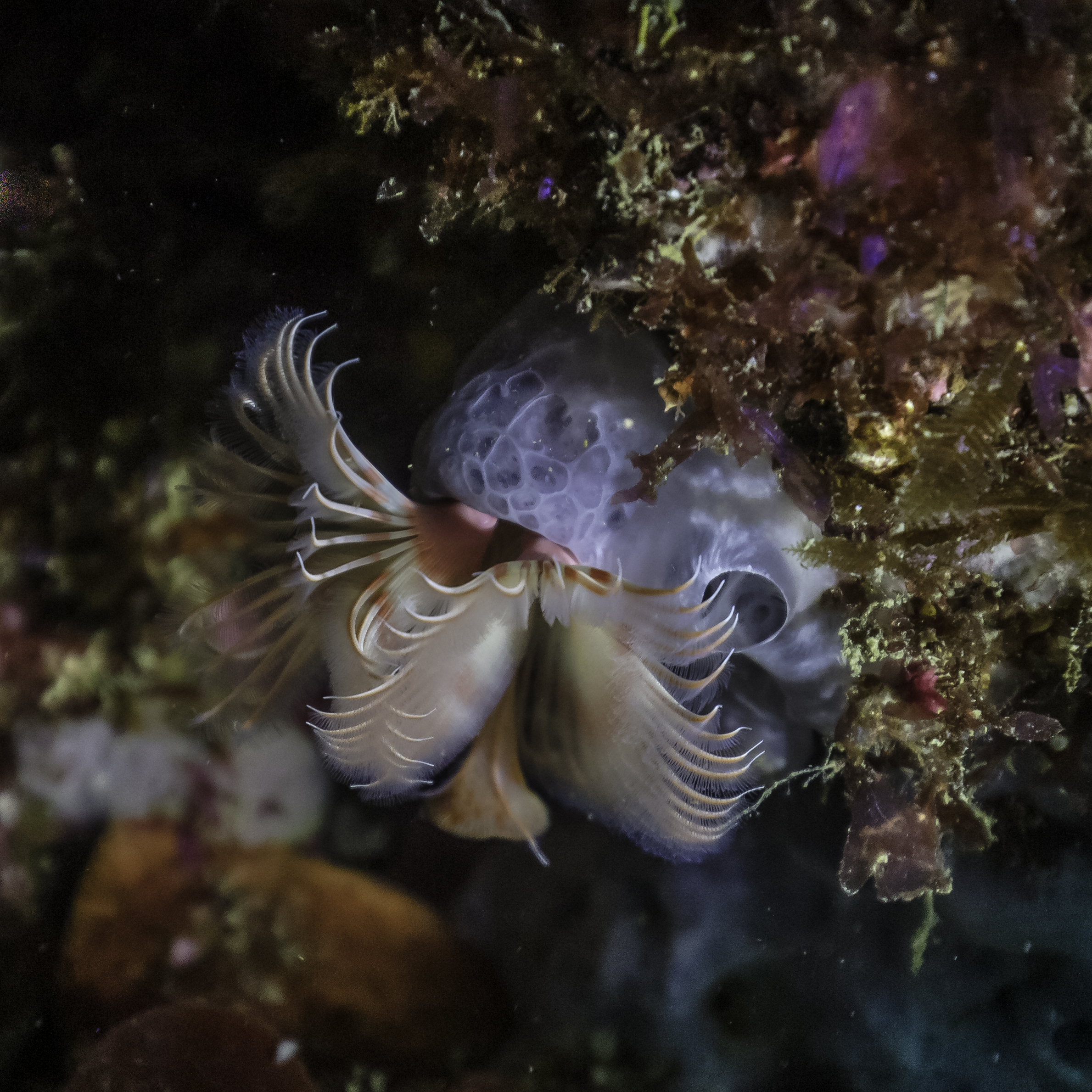
Serpula vermicularis in the Atlantic coast of Portugal

Serpula vermicularis, known by common names including the calcareous tubeworm, fan worm, plume worm or red tube worm, is a species of segmented marine polychaete worm in the family Serpulidae. It is the type species of the genus Serpula and was first described by Carl Linnaeus in his 1767 12th edition of Systema Naturae. It lives in a tube into which it can retract.

== Description ==
Serpula vermicularis lives in a calcareous tube which is attached to a rock, boulder or other hard surface. The tube is often curved, but is not tightly coiled as in some other related species. It can grow to a length of 20 cm (8 in), but is usually shorter than this. The anterior part of the worm protrudes from the tube and has a plume of about 40 feather-like radioles projecting from the second segment, or peristomium, which also houses the two eyes and the mouth. The radioles are bipinnate and covered with fine cilia. They are commonly red, orange or pink and are usually banded with white. A funnel-shaped lid or operculum covers the entrance to the tube when the animal retracts inside. This lid has up to 160 fine creases around its edge and is symmetrical and usually red. It is sometimes divided into two. The yellow-coloured body has seven thoracic segments and up to 190 abdominal segments which are protected by the tube. At least four segments with setae (bristles) are found in the thoracic region.

== Distribution ==
Serpula vermicularis is cosmopolitan in distribution. It is found in the Pacific and Indian Oceans and the European seaboard of the Atlantic Ocean, but not on the North American coast. It occurs in the intertidal zone and at depths down to 100 m (330 ft). Also along Southern African coast from Olifant's River to Maputo.

== Habitat ==
Serpula vermicularis grows on hard substrates. It favours shells of bivalves, boulders and man-made structures. Around the United Kingdom, juveniles were found to be plentiful growing on the bryozoan, Flustra foliacea. Large colonies sometimes form, but these are seldom on rocks. Larvae may settle on the tubes of other worms and their subsequent development can form reefs. These reefs are very fragile and often break up. This is sometimes due to the activity of certain boring sponges, such as Cliona celata (red boring sponge).

== Biology ==
The tube of S. vermicularis is made from calcite and aragonite. Calcium for its manufacture is stored in two white sacs on the ventral side of the peristomium. The tube is fabricated by the glandular ventral shields on the other thoracic segments, where calcium is mixed with an organic secretion to make a paste. This is formed into shape by a collar found just behind the first segment, the prostomium.

Serpula vermicularis is a filter feeder and extends its radioles to catch phytoplankton and detritus. The radioles also act as gills. Blood is pumped in and out of these with the flow direction alternating in a single set of vessels. The blood is then pumped through a ventral blood vessel to the tip of the abdomen before returning through a sinus adjoining the gut.

The blood of S. vermicularis contains the oxygen-binding pigment chlorocruorin. As well as transporting oxygen to the tissues, this binds carbon monoxide much more efficiently than does human haemoglobin. This may be the reason why the worm may settle and grow on brown seaweeds such as Fucus, but avoids giant kelp, Nereocystis. The latter uses carbon monoxide to inflate its pneumocysts, and this would be toxic to the worm.

== Life cycle ==
In the United Kingdom, spawning takes place between June and September. The larvae form part of the plankton for up to two months before settling on the seabed. Growth is fairly rapid with tubes extending by 1 centimetre (3/8 in) in a month. The worms mature in about 10 months and may live for several years.

== Ecology ==
Coldwater reefs built up by S. vermicularis take many years to develop and provide a hard substrate which other organisms use. The reefs around the United Kingdom support a diverse community of sessile invertebrates, including sponges, hydroids, ascidians, bryozoans, the worm Pomatoceros triqueter, the sea anemone Metridium senile and bivalves such as Chlamys spp., Modiolus modiolus and queen scallop, Aequipecten opercularis. Macrofauna include crabs such as Cancer pagurus, the sea urchins Echinus esculentus and Psammechinus miliaris, the brittle star Ophiothrix fragilis, the starfish Asterias rubens and the whelk Buccinum undatum. Red algae grow on the reef in shallow water. The tunicate Pyura microcosmus occurs on these reefs, but is seldom seen in other habitats. A large number of cryptic species of microfauna shelter among the tubes.

Predators of the worm include sea urchins, starfish, and the wrasses Crenilabrus melops and Ctenolabrus rupestris.
