= E. polymorpha =

E. polymorpha may refer to:

- Elkinsia polymorpha, a seed fern (family Moresnetiaceae)
- Emmonsia polymorpha, a tabulate coral
- Eudistylia polymorpha, a polychaete worm
