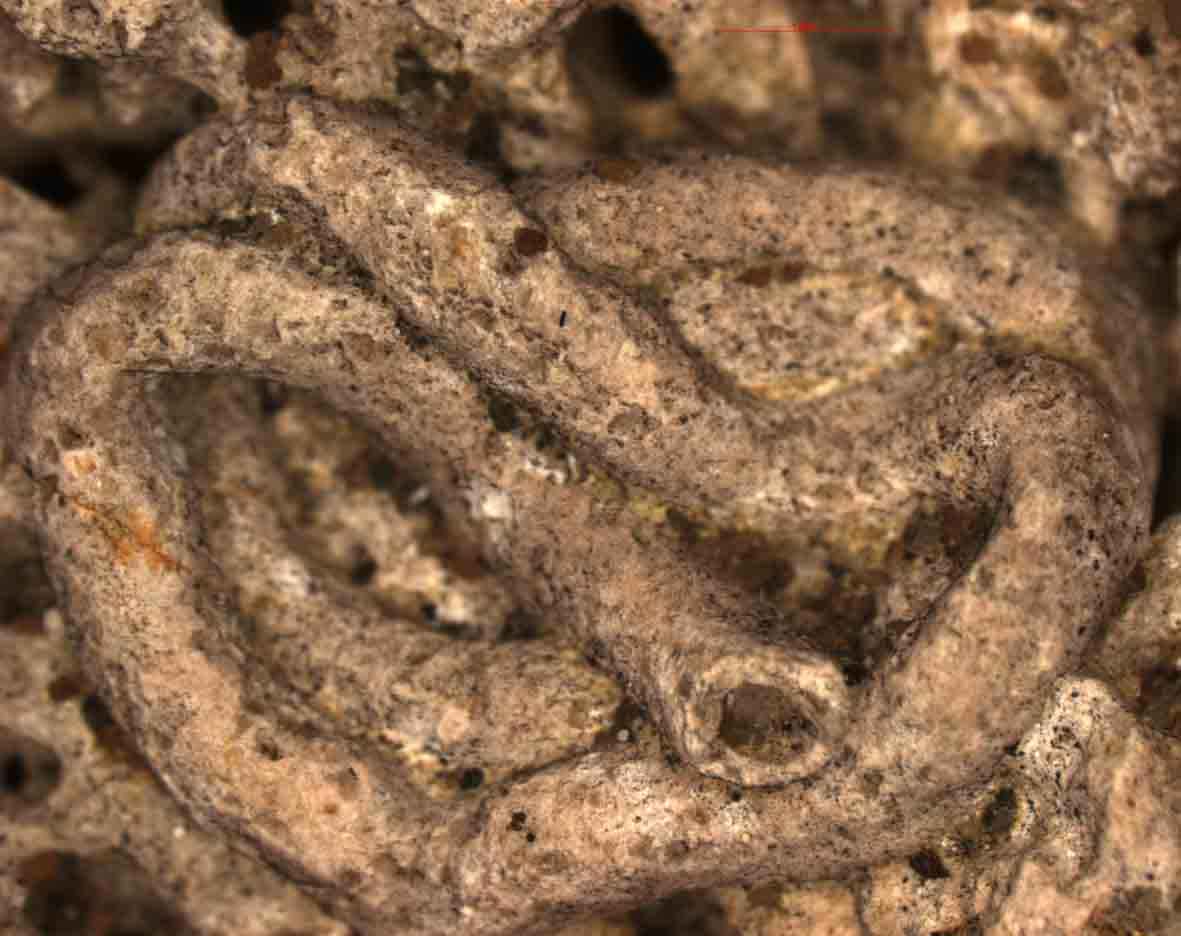
- Glomerula gordialis from the Upper Cretaceous of Germany

Scientific classification
- Kingdom: Animalia
- Phylum: Annelida
- Clade: Pleistoannelida
- Clade: Sedentaria
- Order: Sabellida
- Family: Sabellidae
- Subfamily: Sabellinae
- Genus: Glomerula; Brünnich Nielsen, 1931

Species
- Glomerula piloseta; Glomerula gordialis†; Glomerula serpentina†; Glomerula lombricus†; Glomerula plexus†

= Glomerula =

Glomerula Temporal range: 199–0 Ma Jurassic - present

Genus of annelid worms

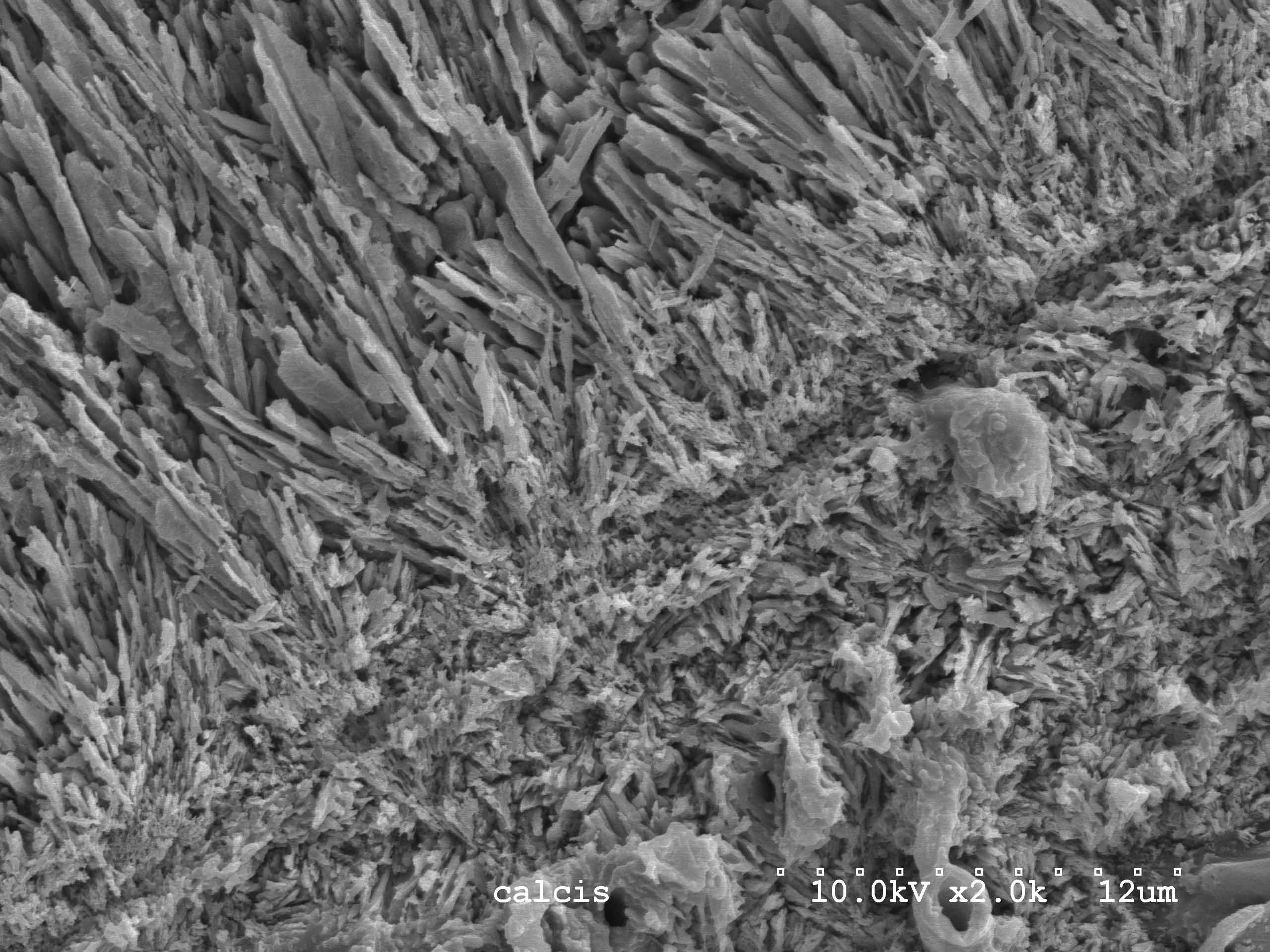
Glomerula piloseta, longitudinal section of the tube

Glomerula is a genus of polychaete worm in the family Sabellidae. It differs from all other Sabellidae in having a calcareous tube and spinose setae. Only one living species, G. piloseta, is known from Lizard Island, Great Barrier Reef, Australia. The oldest fossils of Glomerula are known from the Early Jurassic and their tube microstructure has remained unchanged since then.
