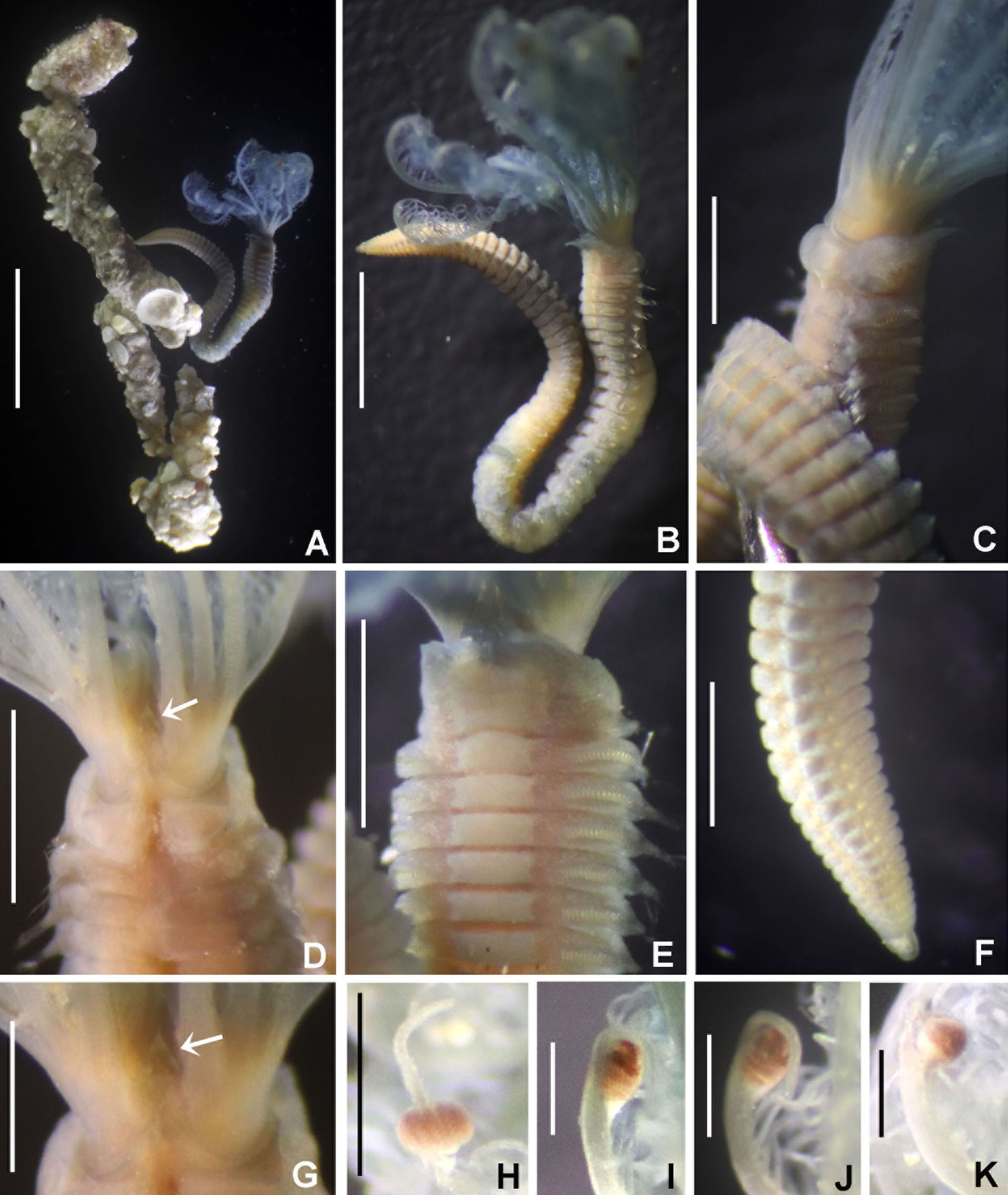

Scientific classification
- Kingdom: Animalia
- Phylum: Annelida
- Clade: Pleistoannelida
- Clade: Sedentaria
- Order: Sabellida
- Family: Sabellidae
- Subfamily: Sabellinae
- Genus: Acromegalomma; Gil & Nishi, 2017

= Acromegalomma =

Genus of marine tubeworms

Acromegalomma is a genus of marine polychaete tube worms in the family Sabellidae, the feather-duster worms.

== Species ==
There are 38 species in the genus Acromegalomma:

- Acromegalomma acrophthalmos (Grube, 1878)
- Acromegalomma adriaticum (Giangrande, Caruso, Mikac & Licciano, 2015)
- Acromegalomma bioculatum (Ehlers, 1887)
- Acromegalomma carunculatum (Tovar-Hernández & Salazar-Vallejo, 2008)
- Acromegalomma cinctum (Fitzhugh, 2003)
- Acromegalomma circumspectum (Moore, 1923)
- Acromegalomma claparedei (Gravier, 1906)
- Acromegalomma coloratum (Chamberlin, 1919)
- Acromegalomma fauchaldi (Giangrande, Licciano & Gambi, 2007)
- Acromegalomma georgiense (Tovar-Hernández & Carrera-Parra, 2011)
- Acromegalomma gesae (Knight-Jones, 1997)
- Acromegalomma heterops (Perkins, 1984)
- Acromegalomma inflatum (Capa & Murray, 2009)
- Acromegalomma interruptum (Capa & Murray, 2009)
- Acromegalomma jubatum (Capa & Murray, 2015)
- Acromegalomma kaikourense (Knight-Jones, 1997)
- Acromegalomma lanigerum (Grube, 1846)
- Acromegalomma lobiferum (Ehlers, 1887)
- Acromegalomma longoventrale (Giangrande, Caruso, Mikac & Licciano, 2015)
- Acromegalomma messapicum (Giangrande & Licciano, 2008)
- Acromegalomma miyukiae (Nishi, 1998)
- Acromegalomma modestum (Quatrefages, 1866)
- Acromegalomma multioculatum (Fitzhugh, 2002)
- Acromegalomma mushaense (Gravier, 1906)
- Acromegalomma nechamae (Knight-Jones, 1997)
- Acromegalomma pacifici (Grube, 1859)
- Acromegalomma perkinsi (Tovar-Hernández & Salazar-Vallejo, 2006)
- Acromegalomma phyllisae (Capa & Murray, 2009)
- Acromegalomma pigmentum (Reish, 1963)
- Acromegalomma pseudogesae (Mikac, Giangrande & Licciano, 2013)
- Acromegalomma quadrioculatum (Wiley, 1905)
- Acromegalomma roulei (Gravier, 1908)
- Acromegalomma schwindtae (Tovar-Hernández, de León-González & Bybee, 2017)
- Acromegalomma splendidum (Moore, 1905)
- Acromegalomma sumbense (Tovar-Hernández, ten Hove & de León-González in Tovar-Hernández et al., 2020)
- Acromegalomma suspiciens (Ehlers, 1904)
- Acromegalomma trioculatum (Reish, 1968)
- Acromegalomma vesiculosum (Montagu, 1813)
