= Chone =

Chone may refer to:

== Places ==
- Casabona, Italy, previously the Ancient Greek city of Chone, Magna Graecia
- Chone, Ecuador, an Ecuadorian city located in the Manabí Province
- Chone Canton, Ecuador, whose capital is Chone
- Chone River, a river in Ecuador
- Chone Monastery, in Jonê County, Gansu, China
- Jonê County, a.k.a. Chone County, Gansu, China

== Other uses ==
- Chone Figgins (born 1978), a Major League Baseball utility player
- Saya Chone (1866–1917), Burmese painter
- Chone (annelid), a genus of polychaetes in the family Sabellidae
