= Branchiomma =

- Branchiomma bairdi

Scientific classification
- Kingdom: Animalia
- Phylum: Annelida
- Clade: Pleistoannelida
- Clade: Sedentaria
- Order: Sabellida
- Family: Sabellidae
- Subfamily: Sabellinae
- Genus: Branchiomma; Kölliker, 1858

Genus of annelid

Branchiomma is a genus of annelid in the feather duster worm family, Sabellidae.

Species within Branchiomma generally live in shallow bodies are water including lagoons, bays, and harbors. They are characterized by the presence of paired compound eyes and paired stylodes running along the radiloes. The stylodes are appendages unique to Sabellidae and are important features for identifying species.

== Species ==
There are currently 30 accepted species within the genus:

- Branchiomma arcticum (Ditlevsen, 1937)
- Branchiomma argus (Sars, 1862)
- Branchiomma bahusiense Johansson, 1927
- Branchiomma bairdi (McIntosh, 1885)
- Branchiomma boholense (Grube, 1878)
- Branchiomma bombyx (Dalyell, 1853)
- Branchiomma capense (McIntosh, 1885)
- Branchiomma cingulatum (Grube, 1871)
- Branchiomma coheni Tovar-Hernandez & Knight-Jones, 2006
- Branchiomma conspersum (Ehlers, 1887)
- Branchiomma corolliferum (Ehlers, 1913)
- Branchiomma costaricense Tovar-Hernández & Dean, 2010
- Branchiomma curtum (Ehlers, 1901)
- Branchiomma galei (Augener, 1914)
- Branchiomma gravelyi (Aziz, 1938)
- Branchiomma iliffei Tovar-Hernandez & Knight-Jones, 2006
- Branchiomma inconspicua (M. Sars in G.O. Sars, 1872)
- Branchiomma infarctum (Krøyer, 1856)
- Branchiomma luctuosum (Grube, 1870)
- Branchiomma lucullanum (Delle Chiaje, 1828)
- Branchiomma maerli Licciano & Giangrande, 2008
- Branchiomma moebii Knight-Jones, 1994
- Branchiomma natalense (Kinberg, 1866)
- Branchiomma nigromaculatum (Baird, 1865)
- Branchiomma patriota Nogueira, Rossi & Lopez, 2006
- Branchiomma pseudoviolacea (Augener, 1922)
- Branchiomma spongiarum Knight-Jones, 1994
- Branchiomma violaceum (Schmarda, 1861)
- Branchiomma wyvillei (McIntosh, 1885)
