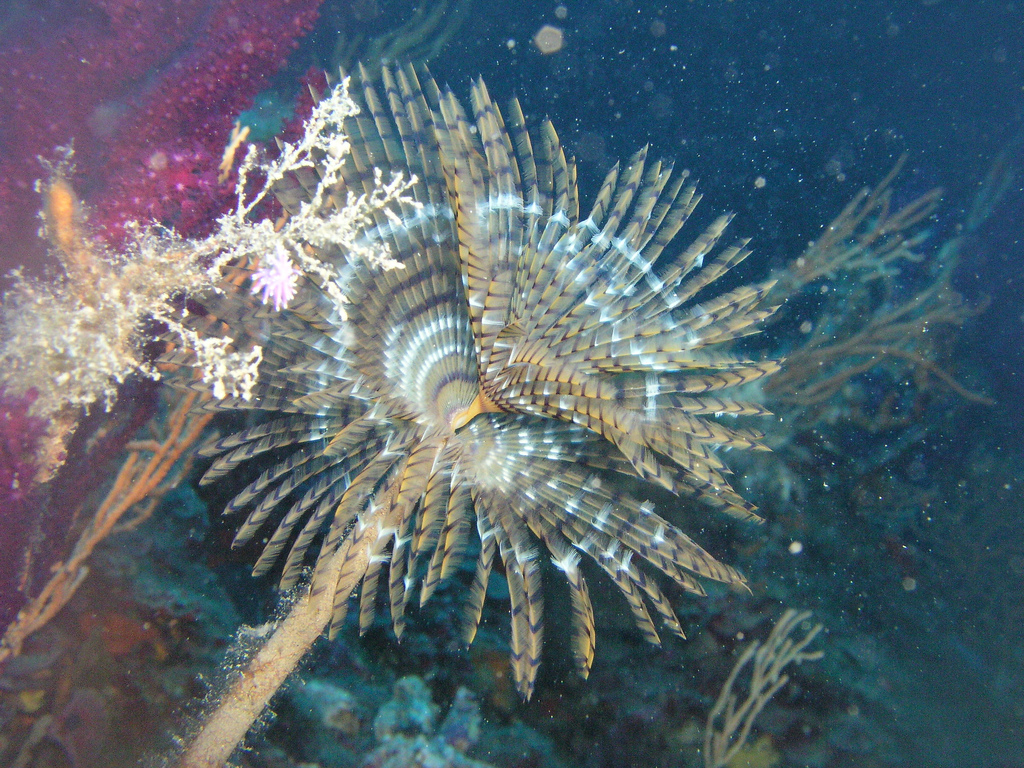
- Sabella spallanzanii

Scientific classification
- Kingdom: Animalia
- Phylum: Annelida
- Clade: Pleistoannelida
- Clade: Sedentaria
- Order: Sabellida
- Family: Sabellidae
- Subfamily: Sabellinae
- Genus: Sabella; Linnaeus, 1767

Species
- Sabella aculeata Gmelin in Linnaeus, 1788; Sabella amaeana Johnston, 1833; Sabella ammonita Gmelin in Linnaeus, 1788; Sabella arenaria Montagu, 1803; Sabella arundinacea Gmelin in Linnaeus, 1788; Sabella brevibarbis Grube, 1860; Sabella calamus Renier, 1847; Sabella chloraema Williams, 1851; Sabella clavata Gmelin in Linnaeus, 1788; Sabella compressa Montagu, 1803; Sabella conica Gmelin in Linnaeus, 1788; Sabella corticalis Gmelin in Linnaeus, 1788; Sabella crispa Krøyer, 1856; Sabella cucullus Quatrefages, 1866; Sabella curta Montagu, 1803; Sabella denudata Delle Chiaje, 1841; Sabella dimidiata Gmelin in Linnaeus, 1788; Sabella discifera Grube, 1874; Sabella fallax Quatrefages, 1866; Sabella fidelia Krøyer, 1856; Sabella filialghifera Chiereghini in Siebold, 1850; Sabella fixa Gmelin in Linnaeus, 1788; Sabella flabellata Savigny in Grube, 1850; Sabella fragilis Grube, 1863; Sabella fusca Grube, 1870; Sabella gracilis Grube, 1840; Sabella grossa Baird, 1865; Sabella helicina Gmelin in Linnaeus, 1788; Sabella hospita Williams, 1859; Sabella hystricis McIntosh, 1916; Sabella imberbis Grube, 1863; Sabella intermedia Quatrefages, 1866; Sabella judica Savigny, 1822; Sabella kroyeri Quatrefages, 1866; Sabella lamyi Gravier, 1906; Sabella latisetosa Grube, 1840; Sabella marsupialis Gmelin in Linnaeus, 1788; Sabella melanochlora Schmarda, 1861; Sabella membranacea Renier, 1804; Sabella mossambica Peters, 1854; Sabella muelleri Krøyer, 1856; Sabella neapolitana Iroso, 1921; Sabella negate Bosc in Quatrefages, 1866; Sabella nigra Gmelin in Linnaeus, 1788; Sabella norwegica Gmelin in Linnaeus, 1788; Sabella nuda Wagner, 1832; Sabella nudicollis Krøyer, 1856; Sabella occidentalis Baird, 1865; Sabella pacifici Grube, 1859; Sabella pavonina Savigny, 1822; Sabella pottaei Quatrefages, 1866; Sabella pottoei Quatrefages, 1866; Sabella pumilio Krøyer, 1856; Sabella punctulata Haswell, 1884; Sabella pusilla Johansson, 1922; Sabella ramosa Olivi, 1792; Sabella rectangula Gmelin in Linnaeus, 1788; Sabella ringens Linnaeus, 1767; Sabella rudis Pennant, 1777; Sabella sabulosa Gmelin in Linnaeus, 1788; Sabella samoensis Grube, 1870; Sabella sarsi Krøyer, 1856; Sabella scabra Linnaeus, 1767; Sabella scoparia Grube, 1870; Sabella scruposa Linnaeus, 1767; Sabella secusolutus Hoagland, 1920; Sabella setiformis Montagu, 1803; Sabella sosias Krøyer, 1856; Sabella southerni McIntosh, 1916; Sabella spallanzanii (Gmelin, 1791); Sabella spirobranchia Zachs, 1933; Sabella stagnalis Gmelin in Linnaeus, 1788; Sabella subcylindrica Montagu, 1803; Sabella teredula Chiereghini in Siebold, 1850; Sabella tricolor Grube, 1878; Sabella trigona Chiereghini in Siebold, 1850; Sabella uncinata Gmelin in Linnaeus, 1788; Sabella vegetabilis Gmelin in Linnaeus, 1788; Sabella ventilabrum Savigny in Lamarck, 1818; Sabella verticillata Quatrefages, 1866; Sabella zonalis Stimpson, 1854

= Sabella (annelid) =

Genus of annelids

Sabella is a genus of marine polychaete worm. Members of this genus are filter feeders and there are about ninety species. They live in tubes made of mud that project from the sand surface. They have a crown of feathery tentacles that protrude when the animal is submerged but are retracted when the animal is above water.
