= Respiratory pigment =

Metalloprotein

A respiratory pigment is a metalloprotein that serves a variety of important functions, its main being O_{2} transport. Other functions performed include O_{2} storage, CO_{2} transport, and transportation of substances other than respiratory gases. There are four major classifications of respiratory pigment: hemoglobin, hemocyanin, erythrocruorin–chlorocruorin, and hemerythrin. The heme-containing globin (Note: also known as "hemoglobin", in a lax sense) is the most commonly-occurring respiratory pigment, occurring in at least 9 different phyla of animals.

== Comparison of respiratory pigments ==
Metalloprotein	Globins		Hemocyanin	Hemerythrin
Metalloprotein	Hemoglobin (Note: in the strict sense, for the tetrameric form)	Erythrocruorin and chlorocruorin	Hemocyanin	Hemerythrin
O_{2} Binding Material	Iron	Iron	Copper	Iron
Location	Intracellular	Extracellular	Extracellular	Intracellular
Source Organism	Almost all vertebrates	Annelids and arthropods; Chlorocruorin: 4 families of marine polychaetes	Arthropoda and Mollusca	Sipuncula, priapulida, some brachiopoda, and a single annelid genus
Oxygenated Color	Bright red	Erythrocruorin: Bright red; Chlorocruorin: Green when diluted, red when concentrated	Blue	Violet
Deoxygenated Color	Crimson	Erythrocruorin: Dark red; Chlorocruorin: Green when diluted, brown-red when concentrated	Colorless	Colorless

Hemoglobin, erythrocruorin, and chlorocruorin are all globins, iron-heme proteins with a common core. Their color comes from the absorption spectra of heme with Fe^{2+}. Erythrocruorin and chlorocruorin are closely related giant globins found used by some invertebrates. Chlorocruorin has a special heme group, giving it different colors.

Any of various coloured conjugated proteins, such as hemoglobin, occur in living organisms and function in oxygen transfer in cellular respiration.

== Globins ==
The globin is thought to be a very ancient molecule, even acting as a molecular clock of sorts. It has even been used to date the separation of vertebrates and invertebrates more than 1 billion years ago. Globin enjoys a large biological distribution, not only occurring among more than 9 different phyla of animals but occurring in some fungi and bacteria as well, even being identified in nitrogen-fixing nodules on the roots of some leguminous plants. The isolation of the globin gene from plant root cells has suggested that the globin genes that were inherited from a common ancestor shared by plants and animals may be present in all plants.

=== Vertebrate hemoglobin ===
Vertebrates use a tetrameric hemoglobin, carried in red blood cells, to breathe. There are multiple types of hemoglobin that have been found in the human body alone. Hemoglobin A is the “normal” hemoglobin, the variant of hemoglobin that is most common after birth. Hemoglobin A2 is a minor component of hemoglobin found in red blood cells. Hemoglobin A2 makes up less than 3% of total red blood cell hemoglobin. Hemoglobin F typically is only found in the fetal stage of development. While Hemoglobin F falls dramatically after birth, it is possible for some people to produce some levels of Hemoglobin F throughout their full life.

=== Other animal hemoglobins ===
Animals use a great variety of globins for respiration. By structure, they can be classified as:

- Intracellular Hbs. These globins reside inside a cell, much like the vertebrate Hb.
- Multi-subunit Hbs. These globins form complexes and work outside a cell.
- Multi-domain, multisubunit Hbs. These globins form complexes, work outside a cell, and have multiple globin domains per peptide chain.

Erythrocruorin and chlorocruorin belong to the multisubunit Hbs, specifically of the 12-dodecamer type.

=== Leghemoglobin ===
Leghemoglobin is a molecular similar in structure to myoglobin that is currently being used in artificial meat products, such as the Impossible Burger, to simulate both the color and taste of meat. Similar in function to hemoglobin, leghemoglobin contains trace amounts of iron, but it is primarily found in plant roots.

== Hemocyanin ==
Hemocyanin is a respiratory pigment that uses copper as its oxygen-binding molecule, as opposed to iron with hemoglobin. Hemocyanin is found in both arthropods and Mollusca, however it is thought that the molecule independently evolved in both phyla. There are several other molecules that exist in arthropods and Mollusca that are similar in structure to hemocyanin but serve entirely different purposes. For example, there are copper-containing tyrosinases that play significant roles in immune defense, wound healing, and the arthropod's cuticle. Molecules similar to hemocyanin in structure are grouped in under the hemocyanin superfamily.
