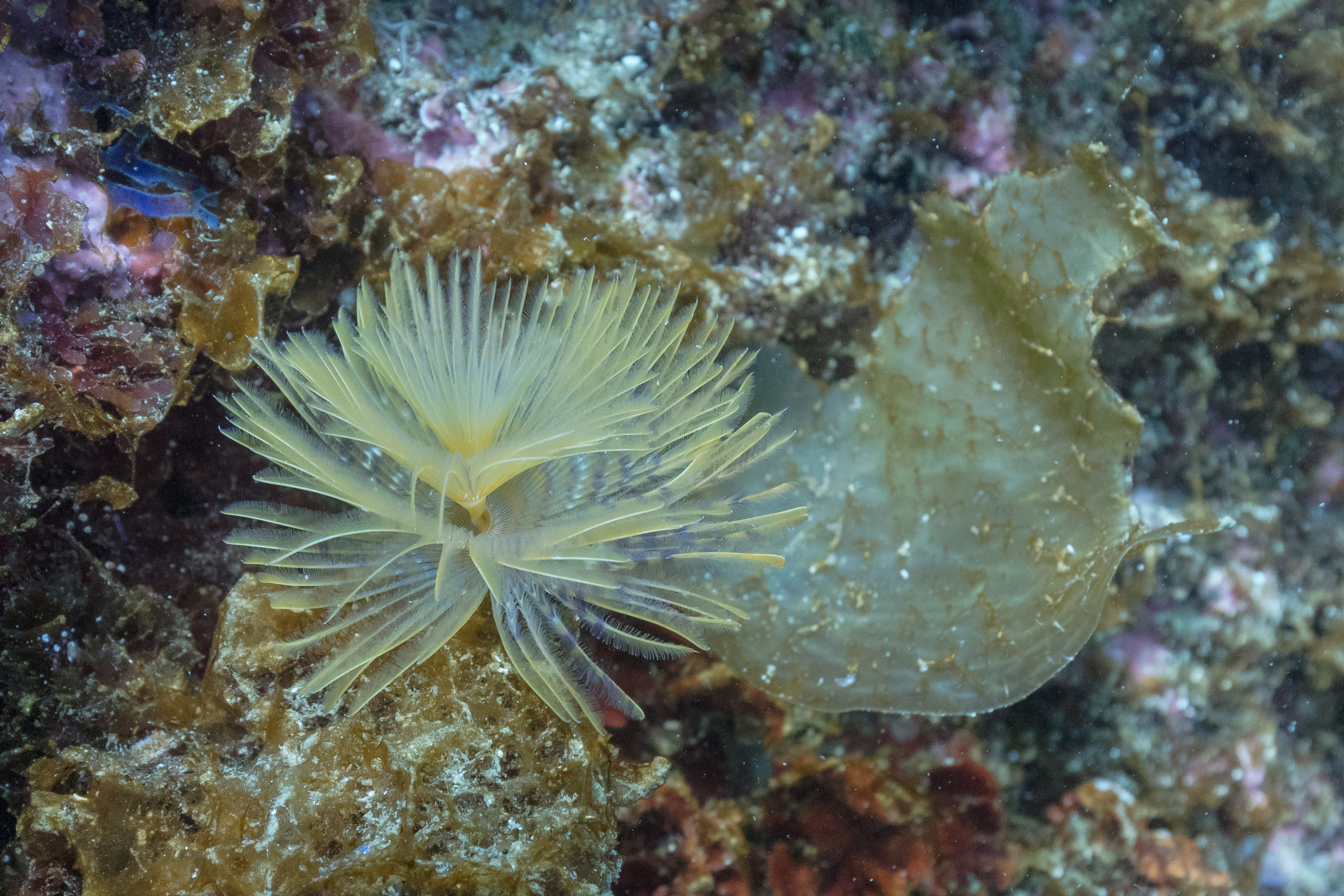

Scientific classification
- Kingdom: Animalia
- Phylum: Annelida
- Clade: Pleistoannelida
- Clade: Sedentaria
- Order: Sabellida
- Family: Sabellidae
- Genus: Sabella
- Species: S. spallanzanii

Binomial name
- Sabella spallanzanii (Gmelin, 1791)

Synonyms
- Corallina tubularia-melitensis Ellis, 1755; Sabella penicillus Linnaeus, 1767; Serpula penicillus Linnaeus, 1758; Spirographis spallanzanii (Viviani, 1805); Tubularia spallanzanii Gmelin, 1791

= Sabella spallanzanii =

Species of annelid worm

Sabella spallanzanii is a species of marine polychaete worms in the family Sabellidae. Common names include the Mediterranean fanworm, the feather duster worm, the European fan worm and the pencil worm. It is native to shallow waters in the northeastern Atlantic Ocean and the Mediterranean Sea. It has spread to various other parts of the world and is included on the Global Invasive Species Database maintained by the IUCN.

The species' name commemorates the 18th-century biologist Lazzaro Spallanzani.

== Description ==
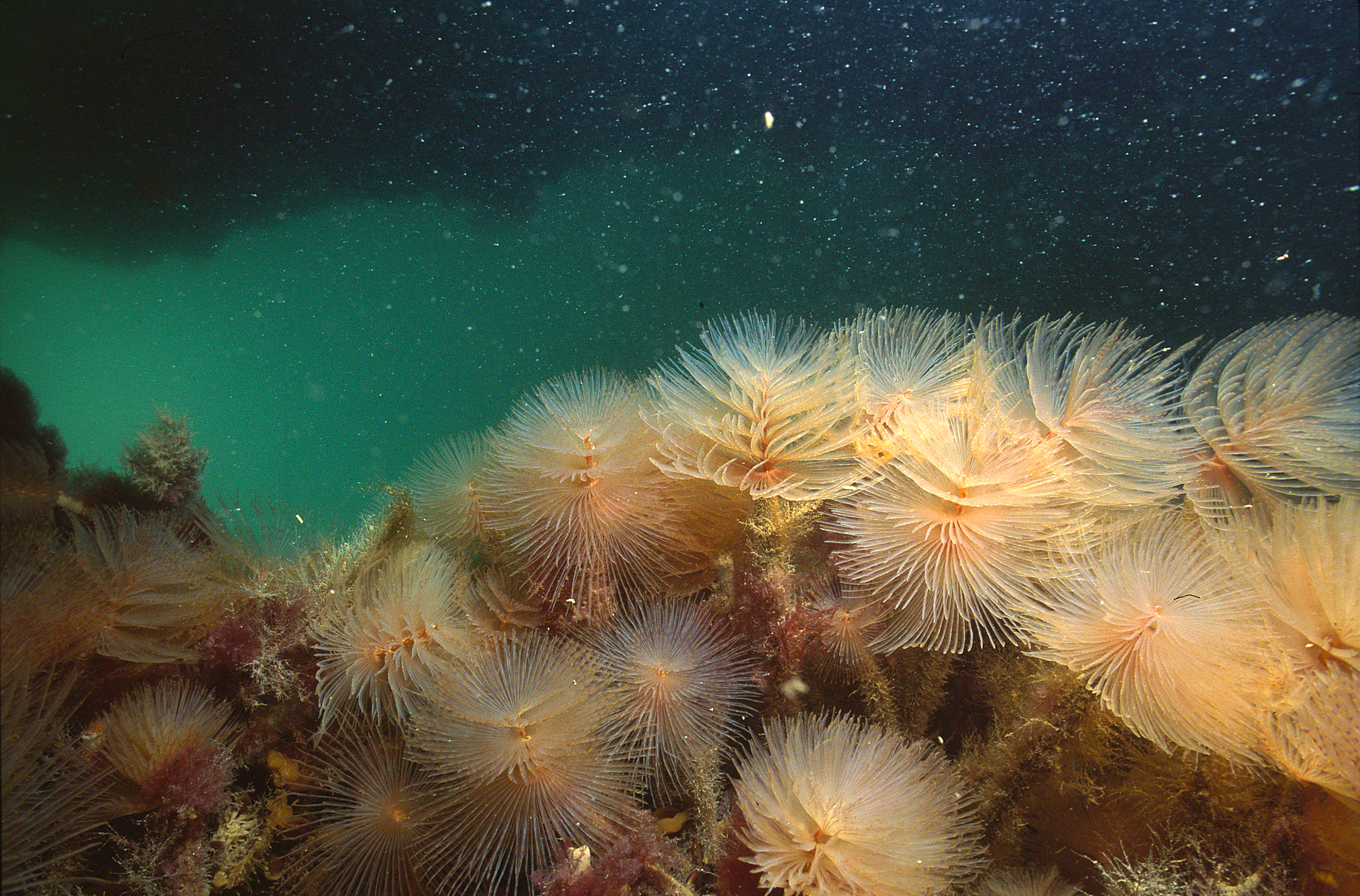
European fanworms are an invasive species in Australian waters.

European fan worms grow to a total length of 9 to 40 cm (4 to 16 in) and are usually larger in deep water. They have stiff, sandy tubes formed from hardened mucus secreted by the worm which protrude from the sand, and a two-layered crown of feeding tentacles which can be retracted into the tube. One of the layers forms a distinct spiral. The colour of the tentacles is variable but they are usually banded in orange, purple and white or they may be a uniform pale grey. Various epiphytic organisms settle and grow on the tubes which may be rather wrinkled near their bases.

== Distribution and habitat ==
The European fan worm is native to the northeastern Atlantic Ocean, the North Sea and the Mediterranean Sea. Its range extends from the United Kingdom and Ireland, through France, Spain and Portugal to Italy, Greece and Turkey. It is also known from South America and the southern African Namaqualand coast to Port Elizabeth. It first appeared in Western Australia in 1965 and since then has spread to other parts of southern Australia, and was first seen in New South Wales in 1996. It is regarded as an invasive species in Australia.

It was first recorded in New Zealand in March 2008, and it now occurs across multiple locations across the North and South islands and is regarded as a pest.

It is found at depths down to 30 m (98 ft) and is found in nutrient-rich waters in sheltered locations where there are no strong currents and little wave action. It grows on soft sediments or anchors itself to rocks, mollusc shells, jetties, pontoons or other solid surfaces. It may grow on the hulls of moored boats but does not usually foul vessels that are in frequent use.

== Biology ==
The European fan worm is a filter feeder and feeds on bacteria, zooplankton, phytoplankton and suspended particles of organic matter. Individual worms are either male or female and liberate gametes into the sea. A large female can produce upwards of 50,000 eggs during the breeding season. The larvae are planktonic and settle to the seabed after about two weeks, metamorphosis taking place some ten days later.

== Invasiveness ==
The European fan worm is a rather successful organism whose larvae can easily disperse to new locations. As an invasive species and a filter feeder, it competes with native species and with farmed oysters and mussels for food. Its presence in an area can alter water flows, sedimentation, biofouling and nitrogen cycling. In seagrass meadows it may grow on and weigh down leaf blades. There may be a reduction in the population of cumaceans, harpacticoid copepods and ostracods in the sediment and an increase in amphipods, barnacles and other species of tube worms on the tubes.

== Uses ==
The European fan worm is able to bioaccumulate bacteria and has a profound effect on the marine bacterial environment. Microbes build up in the worm and are present at much higher concentrations in its tissues than in the surrounding water and this means the worm can be used as a bioindicator. It is efficient at filtering out Vibrio spp. bacteria that are pathogenic to fish and shellfish and can cause foodborne illness in man. It can also potentially be used for remediation of polluted water near sewage outlets.
