= Chone (annelid) =

Scientific classification
- Kingdom: Animalia
- Phylum: Annelida
- Clade: Pleistoannelida
- Clade: Sedentaria
- Order: Sabellida
- Family: Sabellidae
- Subfamily: Myxicolinae
- Genus: Chone; Krøyer, 1856

Genus of annelid worms

Chone is a genus of polychaetes belonging to the family Sabellidae.

The genus has cosmopolitan distribution.

Species:

- Chone aurantiaca (Johnson, 1901)
- Chone costulata (Grube, 1877)
- Chone duneri Malmgren, 1867
- Chone eteonicola Heegaard, 1942
- Chone fauveli McIntosh, 1916
- Chone filicaudata Southern, 1914
- Chone gracilis Moore, 1906
- Chone heterochaeta Hofsommer, 1913
- Chone infundibuliformis Krøyer, 1856
- Chone ingeloreae (Plate, 1995)
- Chone kroyerii Sars, 1862
- Chone letterstedti (Kinberg, 1866)
- Chone magna (Moore, 1923)
- Chone megalova Gotto & Leahy, 1988
- Chone minuta Hartman, 1944
- Chone mollis (Bush, 1904)
- Chone murmanica Lukasch, 1910
- Chone oculata Annenkova, 1952
- Chone orensanzi Tovar-Hernández, de León-González & Bybee, 2017
- Chone paucibranchiata (Krøyer, 1856)
- Chone picta (Verrill, 1885)
- Chone rosea Hartmann-Schröder, 1965
- Chone striata Hartmann-Schröder, 1965
- Chone ungavana Chamberlin, 1920
