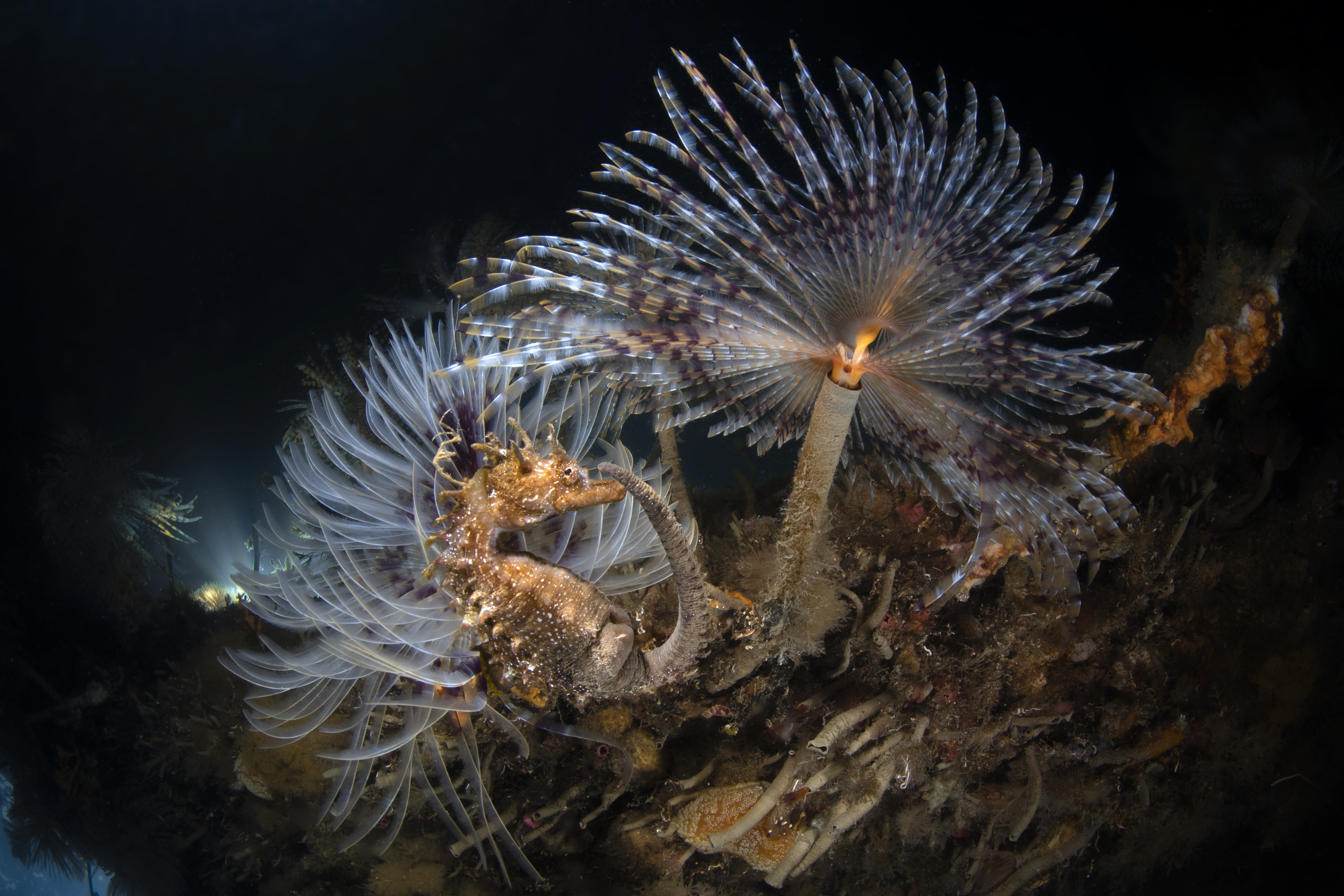
- Peacock worms (Sabella pavonina) with short-snouted seahorse, Porto Cesareo, Italy

Scientific classification
- Kingdom: Animalia
- Phylum: Annelida
- Clade: Pleistoannelida
- Clade: Sedentaria
- Order: Sabellida
- Family: Sabellidae
- Genus: Sabella
- Species: S. pavonina

Binomial name
- Sabella pavonina Savigny, 1820

= Sabella pavonina =

Species of annelid

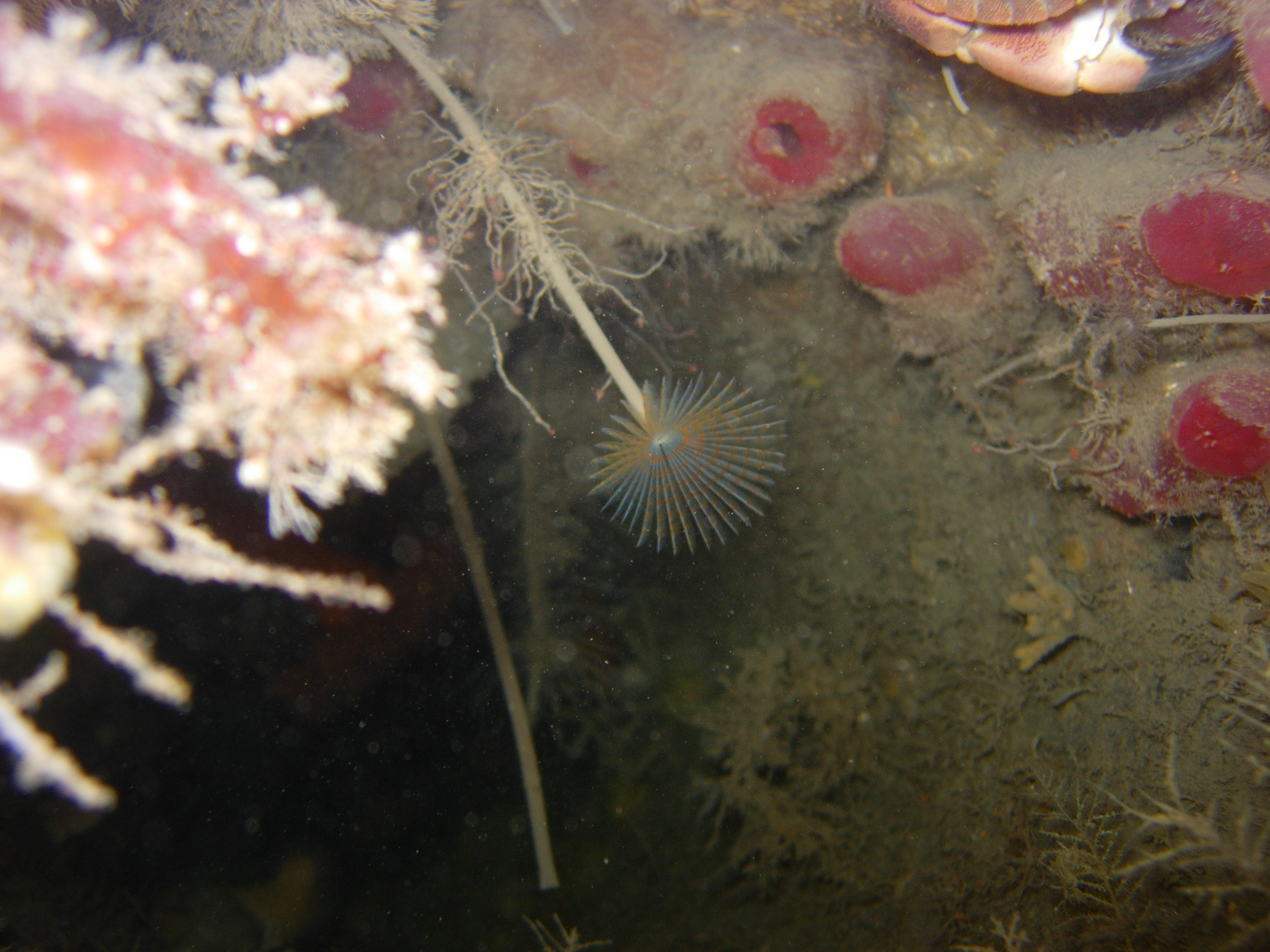
Peacock worm in the Sound of Mull

Sabella pavonina, commonly known as the peacock worm, is a marine polychaete worm belonging to the family Sabellidae. They can be found along the coasts of Western Europe and the Mediterranean. It is found in shallow, tidal waters with a bed of mud, sand or gravel. It is sometimes found on rocks or shipwrecks.

It is 10–25 centimetres (4–10 in) in length. Its body is elongated and divided into 100–600 small segments. The head has two fans of 8–45 feathery radioles arising from fleshy, semi-circular lobes. The body is mostly grey-green while the radioles are brown, red or purple with darker bands.

The worm lives inside a smooth tube of fine mud or sand particles held together with mucus. The tube stands upright with the lower end attached to stones and the upper end protruding from the sea bed. When covered by water, the worm extends its crown out of the tube to feed, using cilia on the radioles to circulate water through the crown. Small food particles are carried down the radioles to the mouth of the worm, while larger particles are rejected, or cemented with mucus to extend the length of the tube. The crown is highly sensitive to light and pressure and quickly retracts in response to motion or shadow.

Sabella pavonina and other Sabellid worms experience heavy predation by bottom-feeding fish, but are capable of regenerating even when a large part of the tube and the worm inside have been bitten off.
