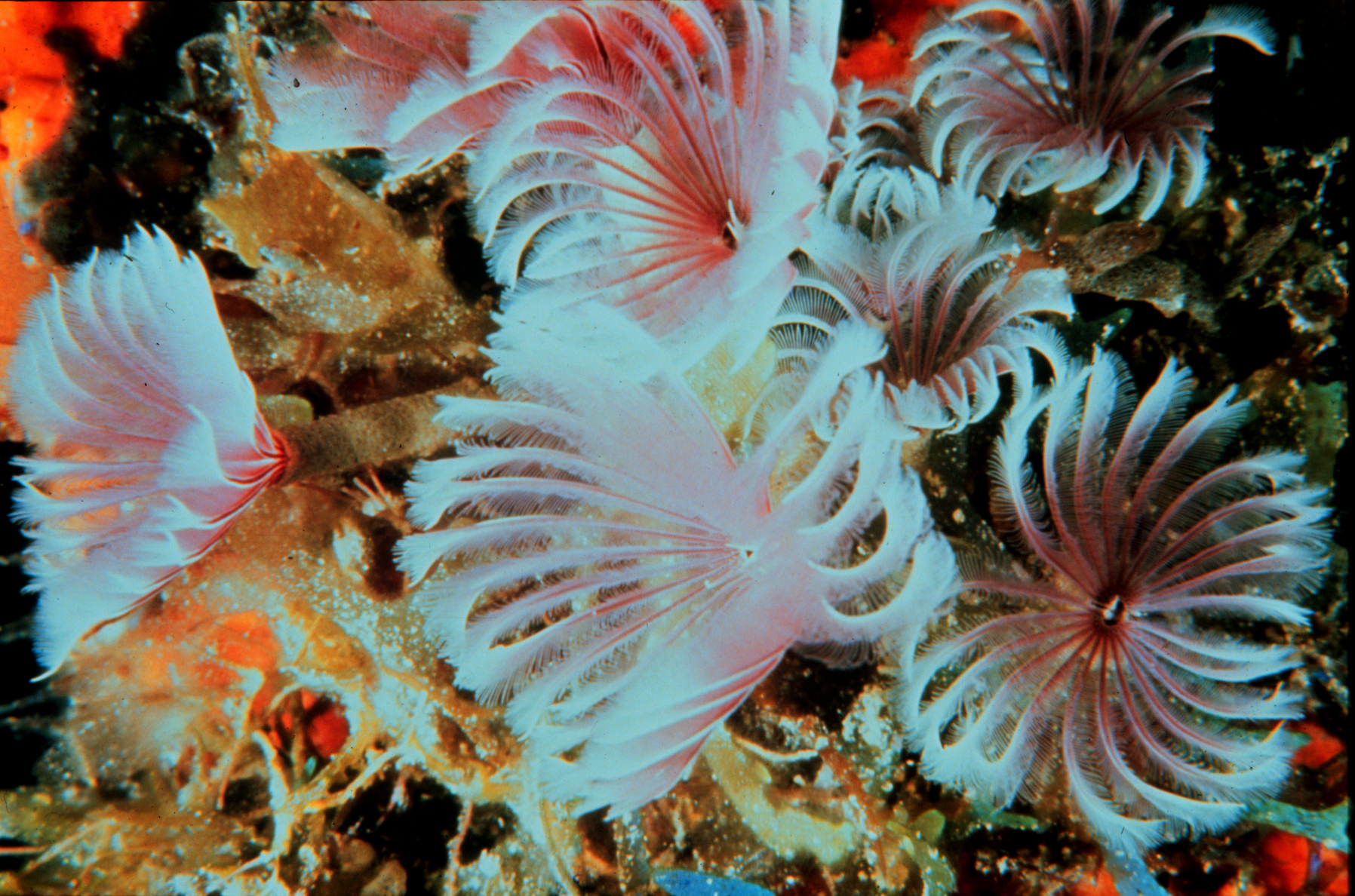
- Eudistylia polymorpha

Scientific classification
- Kingdom: Animalia
- Phylum: Annelida
- Clade: Pleistoannelida
- Clade: Sedentaria
- Order: Sabellida
- Family: Sabellidae
- Genus: Eudistylia
- Species: E. polymorpha

Binomial name
- Eudistylia polymorpha (Johnson, 1901)

Synonyms
- Bispira polymorpha Johnson, 1901; Distylia monterea Chamberlin, 1919; Eudistylia intermedia Bush, 1905

= Eudistylia polymorpha =

Species of annelid

Eudistylia polymorpha, the giant feather duster worm, is a species of marine polychaete worm belonging to the family Sabellidae. Its common name is from the crown of tentacles extended when the animal is under water.

== Description ==
E. polymorpha has a body up to 25 cm (10 in) long and 1.2 cm (0.5 in) thick and lives within a tube. This is parchment-like and composed of sediment cemented with mucus. It is a brownish colour, translucent and often strengthened with sand and shell fragments. On rocky shores, it may be hidden in a crevice and difficult to dislodge. The branchiae (feeding appendages) in the feathery crown also function as gills. They are also known as radioles, and are a shade of red or brown, banded with paler sections. Shades vary, but the most frequent colouration is maroon with orange tips. They arise from two spiral, deeply cleft, bases. They bear eyespots which alert them to sudden shadows or movements nearby. This enables the crown to be retracted into the tube very rapidly when danger threatens. The posterior segments of the worm bear hooked bristles which help anchor it in its tube. E. polymorpha can be distinguished from the very similar Eudistylia vancoveri by the cleft in the crown. Also, E. vancoveri generally has red branchiae with white tips.

== Distribution and habitat ==
The range of E. polymorpha extends along the western coast of North America, from Alaska to California. It is found in the intertidal zone in tide pools and in the neritic zone at depths up to 420 m. It tends to grow in groups and can be found growing on rocks, reefs, pilings, wharves and marinas.

== Biology ==
Eudistylia polymorpha is a filter feeder, catching food particles with its pinnately branched radioles. It prefers to live in moving water so a constant stream of particles comes within reach. These are trapped by the feeding appendages and moved by cilia down grooves in the radioles to the large, funnel-shaped mouth. The gut takes up most of the coelom space and there is a faecal groove for ejection of undigested debris. Any particles too large to be ingested get incorporated into the tube structure.

Reproduction takes place in the spring, and fertilization is external. The gonads are on the dorsal side of the abdomen and the gametes mature in the coelomic spaces. They are then passed forward by cilia along the faecal groove and are released into the water column. The larvae are planktonic and grow rapidly. After about three or four weeks, they settle out as segmented larvae.
