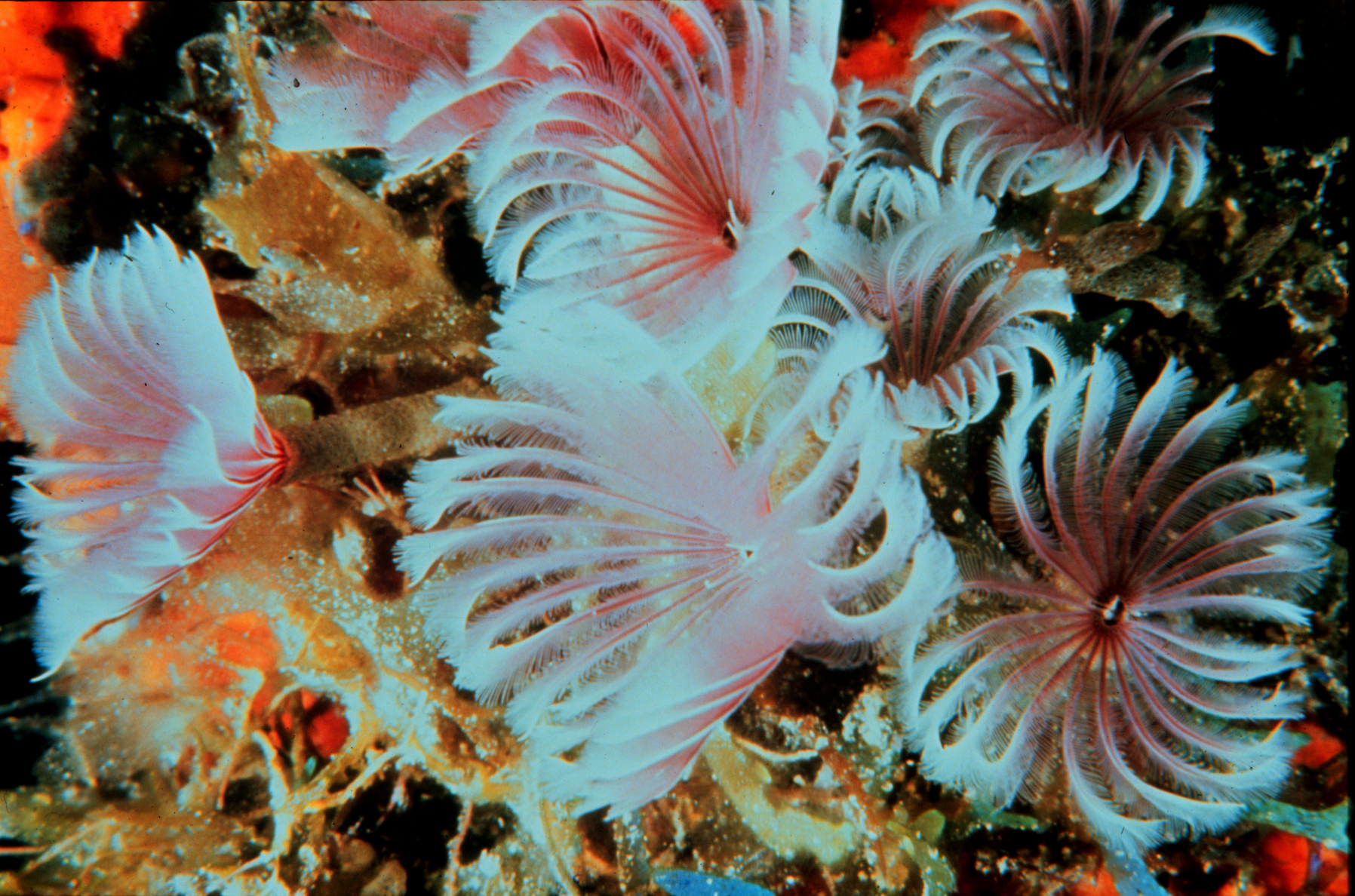
- Eudistylia polymorpha

Scientific classification
- Kingdom: Animalia
- Phylum: Annelida
- Clade: Pleistoannelida
- Clade: Sedentaria
- Order: Sabellida
- Family: Sabellidae
- Subfamily: Sabellinae
- Genus: Eudistylia; Bush, 1905

Species
- See text

= Eudistylia =

Genus of annelid worms

Eudistylia is a genus of marine polychaete worms. The type species is Eudistylia gigantea, now accepted as Eudistylia vancouveri. This worm lives in a parchment-like tube with a single opening from which a crown of tentacles projects when the worm is submerged. It is a sessile filter feeder. Eudistylia vancouveri is unique because it has an operculum which makes it possible to fully retract into the tube when predators are sensed.

== Characteristics ==
The head is formed from the prostomium and peristomium, which are fused. It bears two bundles of radioles or feeding tentacles which together form the funnel-shaped multicolored branchial crown divided into two groups on the dorsal and ventral side of the head. Each radiole is pinnately divided and covered in cilia. It has a central stiffening rod of connective tissue, a number of eyespots and a feeding groove. There are a pair of small palps beside the radioles and a large funnel-shaped mouth. There are about eight thoracic segments and the first has a flange-like collar which secures the worm to the mouth of its tube. The thoracic segments bear two rows of setae or bristles, the notochaetae on the dorsal side are grouped in tufts, while the neurochaetae on the ventral side form a row of small hooks. The abdomen is long and has many segments. The position of the setae on the abdominal segments is reversed, with the notochaetae being hooked and the neurochaetae being tufted. The pygidium at the posterior tip bears the large anus. There is a furrow on the dorsal side of the thoracic and abdominal segments called the faecal groove through which faecal material and gametes are transported to the open end of the tube.

== Distribution ==
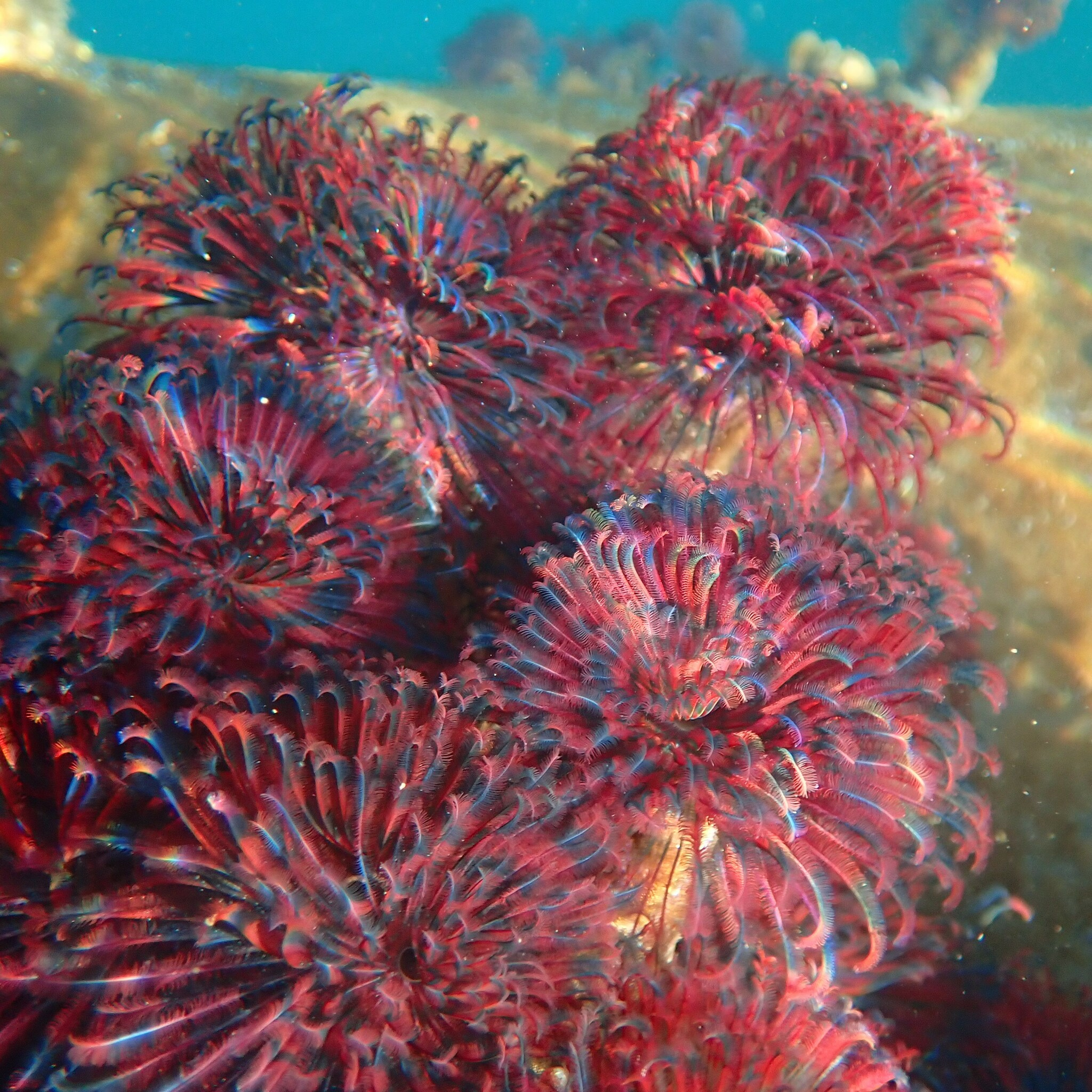
E. vancouveri in Washington

Members of this genus are found on the Pacific coasts of Canada, the United States and Mexico. A group of feather duster worms is called a hummock. When these hummocks are created kelp attaches itself to them by the holdfast, finding a habitat where kelp would not normally establish itself.

== Species ==
- Eudistylia brevicomata (Ehlers, 1905)
- Eudistylia catharinae Banse, 1979
- Eudistylia ceratodaula (Schmarda, 1861)
- Eudistylia polymorpha (Johnson, 1901)
- Eudistylia tenella Bush, 1904
- Eudistylia vancouveri (Kinberg, 1866)
