= Erythrocruorin =

Globin, extracellular
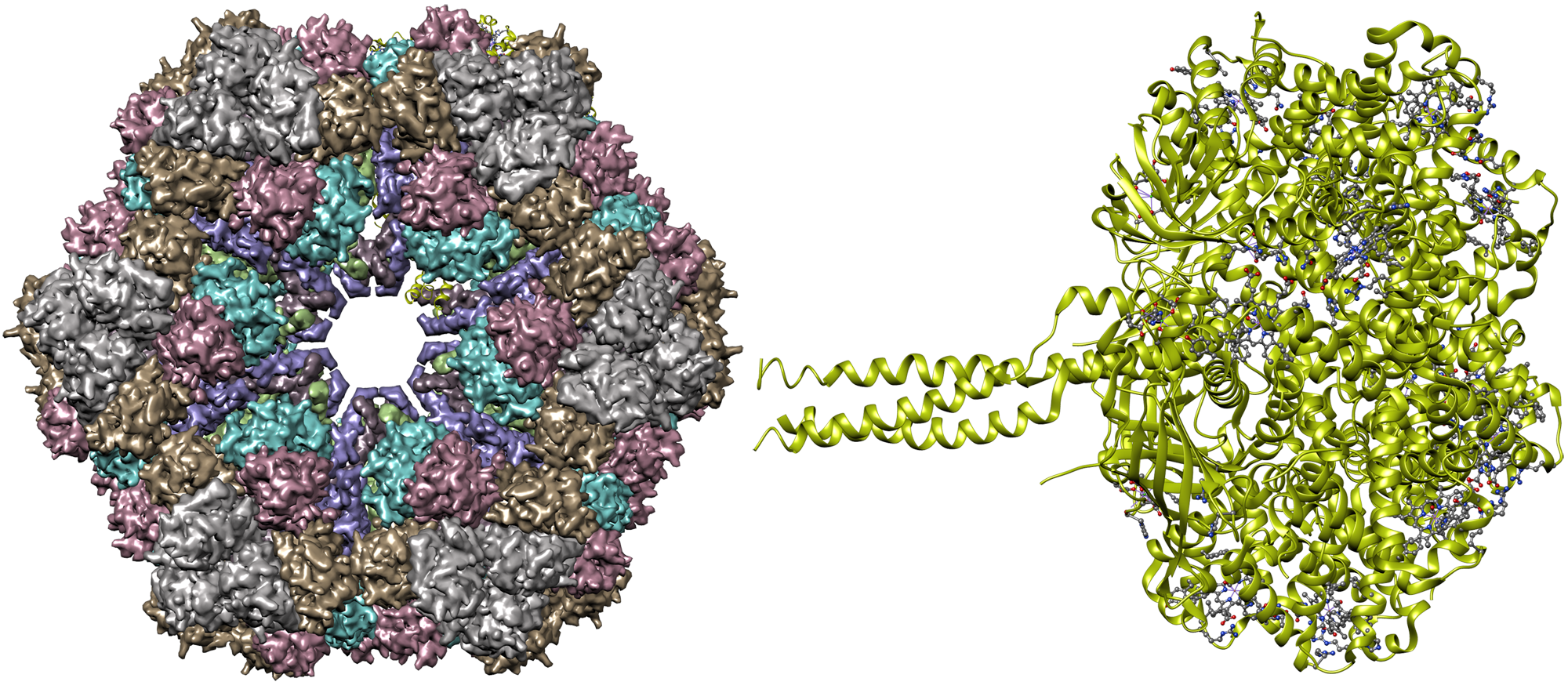
- Lumbricus Erythrocruorin (PDB: 2GTL)

Identifiers
- Symbol: Haemoglobin_extracell
- InterPro: IPR014610
Available protein structures:
- PDB: IPR014610
- AlphaFold: IPR014610

Annelid erythrocruorin linker subunit, C-terminal

Identifiers
- Symbol: Eryth_link_C
- Pfam: PF16915
- InterPro: IPR031639
- CATH: 2gtlM02
- SCOP2: 8029676 / SCOPe / SUPFAM
- CDD: cd11673
Available protein structures:
- PDB: IPR031639 PF16915 (ECOD; PDBsum)
- AlphaFold: IPR031639; PF16915

Heme in chlorocruorin, the source of its unique green color.

Erythrocruorin (from Greek eruthros "red" + Latin cruor "blood"), and the similar chlorocruorin (from Greek khlōros "green" + Latin cruor "blood"), are large oxygen-carrying hemeprotein complexes, which have a molecular mass greater than 3.5 million daltons. Both are sometimes called giant hemoglobin or hexagonal bilayer haemoglobin. They are found in many annelids and arthropods (including some insects).

Chlorocruorin is particularly found in certain marine polychaetes.

== Structure ==
Two structures of erythrocruorin have been resolved. The protein is a highly symmetric assembly made from heme-binding globins and unique linker proteins.

The only significant difference between chlorocruorin and erythrocruorin is that chlorocruorin carries an abnormal heme group structure. Both contain many 16–17 kDa myoglobin-like subunits arranged in a giant complex of over a hundred subunits with interlinking proteins as well with a total weight exceeding 3600 kDa.

Giant hemoglobin is composed of multiple heme-containing globin chains and linker (InterPro: IPR031639) chains. Each species have different amounts of genes for these chains. For example, while a Lamellibrachia sp. has four kinds of globin chains and two kinds of linker chains, Sabella spallanzanii has three globin chains and three linker chains. The exact stoichiometric ratios and arrangement is unknown, but is thought to resemble that of erythocrorins.

== Properties ==
Erythrocruorin has a weaker affinity for oxygen than that of most hemoglobins. A dichromatic compound, chlorocruorin is noted for appearing green in dilute solutions, though it appears light red when found in concentrated solutions.

This enormous macromolecule is typically found free floating in the plasma, and not contained within red blood cells.
