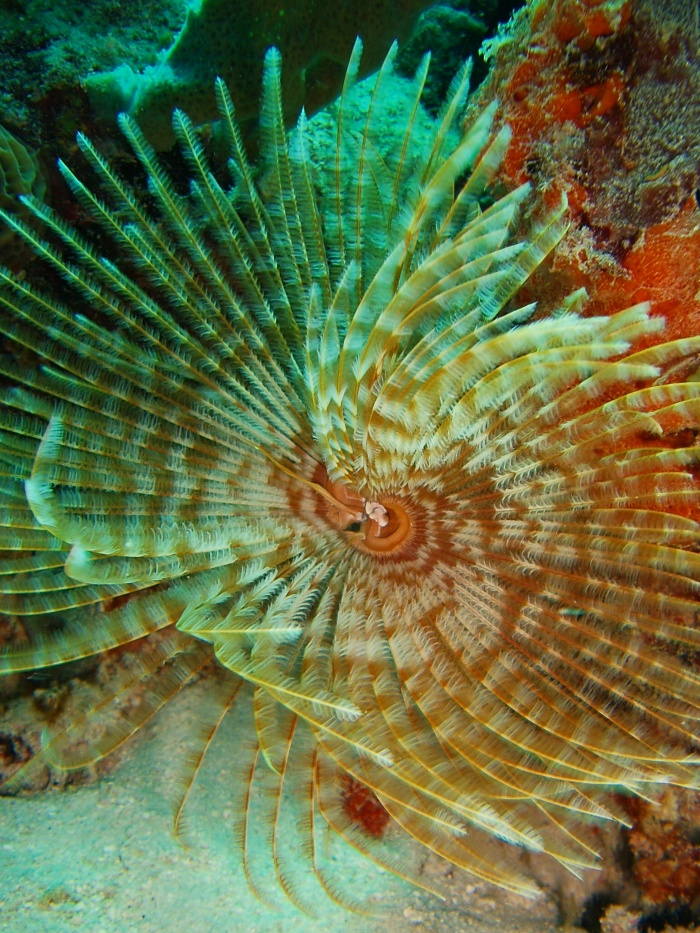
- Sabellidae worm, probably Sabellastarte sp.

Scientific classification
- Kingdom: Animalia
- Phylum: Annelida
- Clade: Pleistoannelida
- Clade: Sedentaria
- Order: Sabellida
- Family: Sabellidae; Malmgren, 1867

Subfamilies
- Fabriciinae; Myxicolinae; Sabellinae

= Sabellidae =

Sabellidae Temporal range: Jurassic–Recent

Family of annelid worms

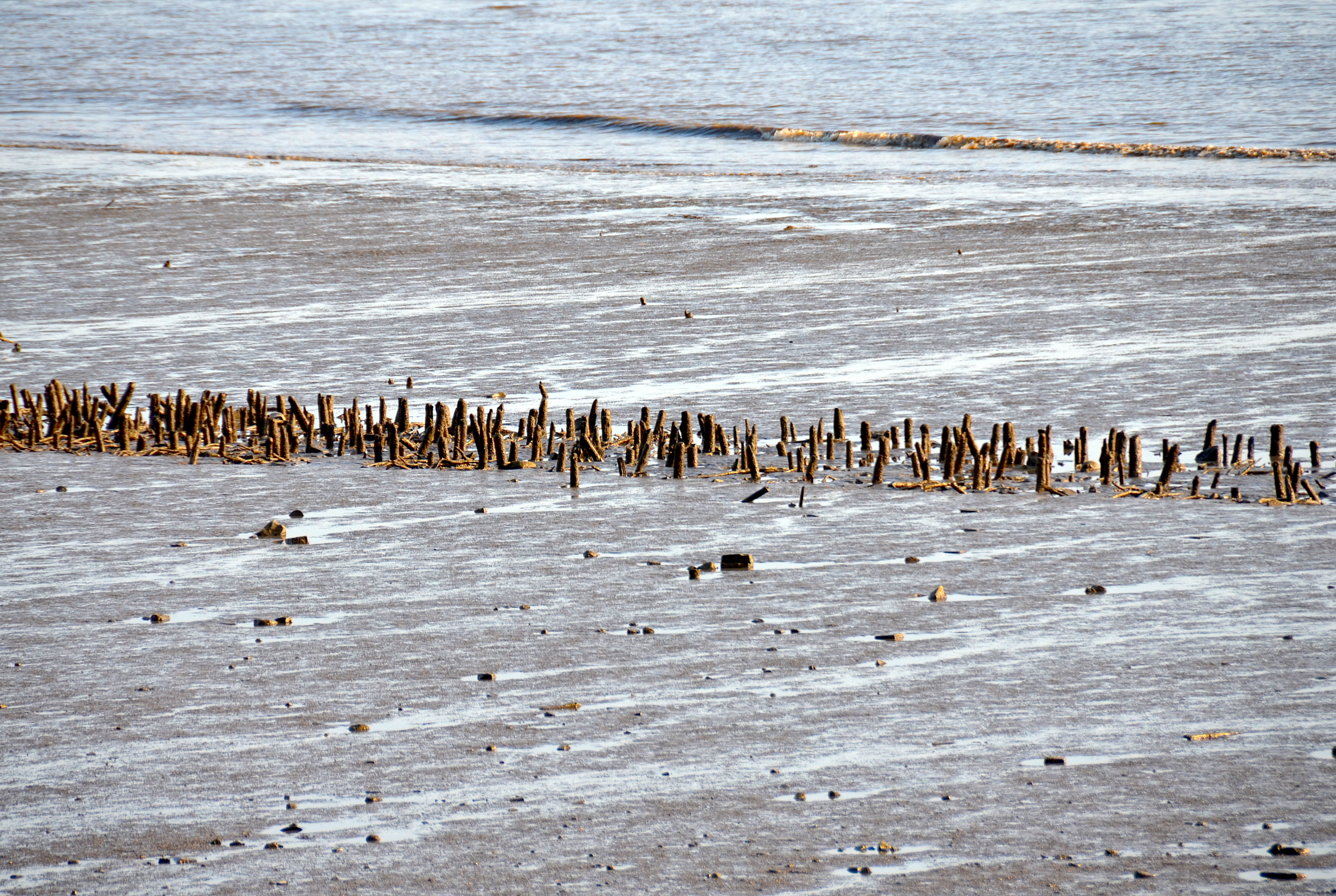
Sabellidae tubes at Bremerhaven

Sabellidae, or feather duster worms, are a family of marine polychaete tube worms characterized by protruding feathery branchiae. Sabellids build tubes out of a tough, parchment-like exudate, strengthened with sand and bits of shell. Unlike the other sabellids, the genus Glomerula secretes a tube of calcium carbonate instead. Sabellidae can be found in subtidal habitats around the world. Their oldest fossils are known from the Early Jurassic.

== Characteristics ==
Feather-duster worms have a crown of feeding appendages or radioles in two fan-shaped clusters projecting from their tubes when under water. Each radiole has paired side branches making a two-edged comb for filter feeding. Most species have a narrow collar below the head. The body segments are smooth and lack parapodia. The usually eight thoracic segments bear capillaries dorsally and hooked chaetae (bristles) ventrally. The abdominal segments are similar, but with the position of the capillaries and chaetae reversed. The posterior few abdominal segments may form a spoon-shaped hollow on the ventral side. Size varies between tiny and over 10 cm (4 in) long. Some small species can bend over and extend their tentacles to the sea floor to collect detritus.

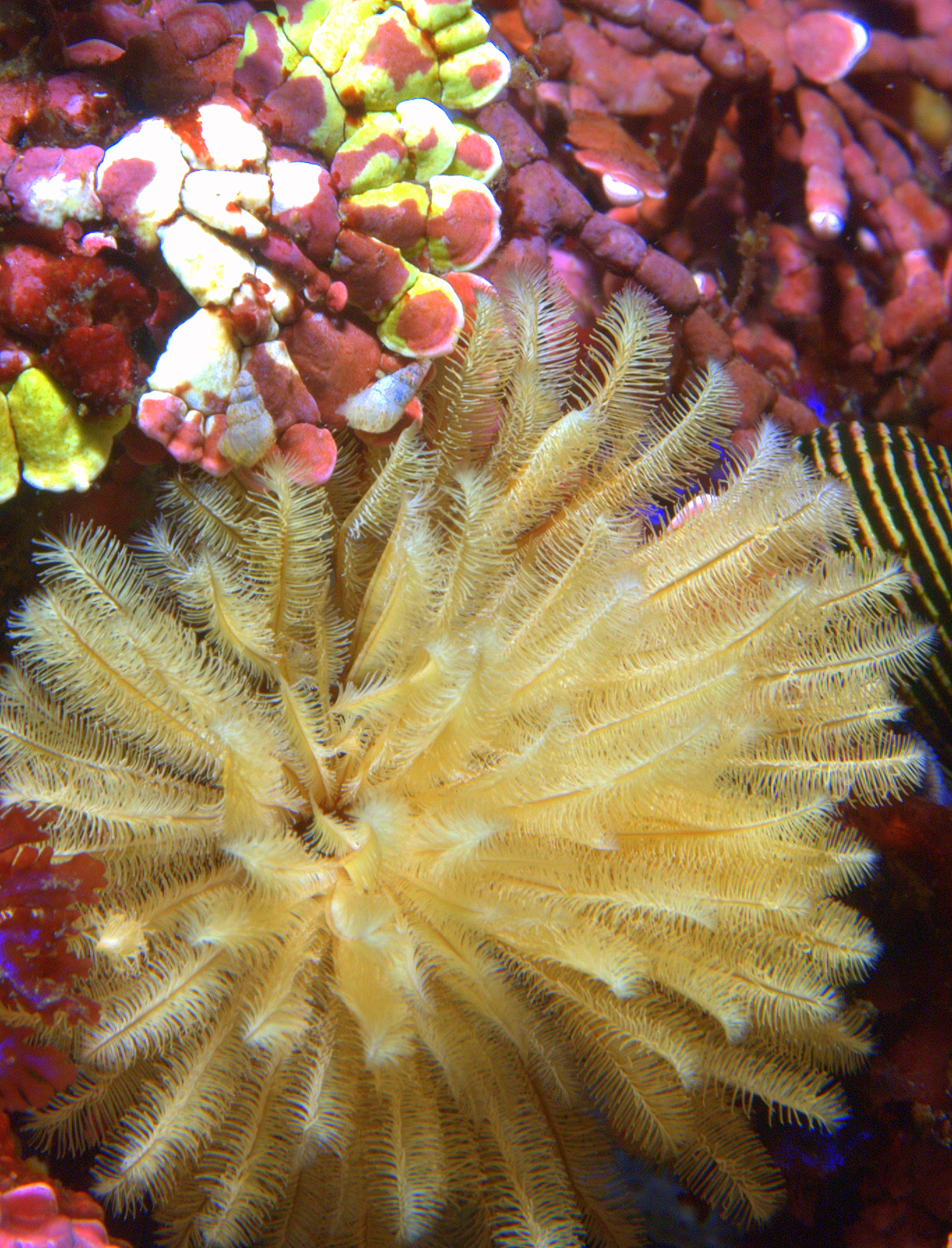
Sabellid with feathery branchiae extended

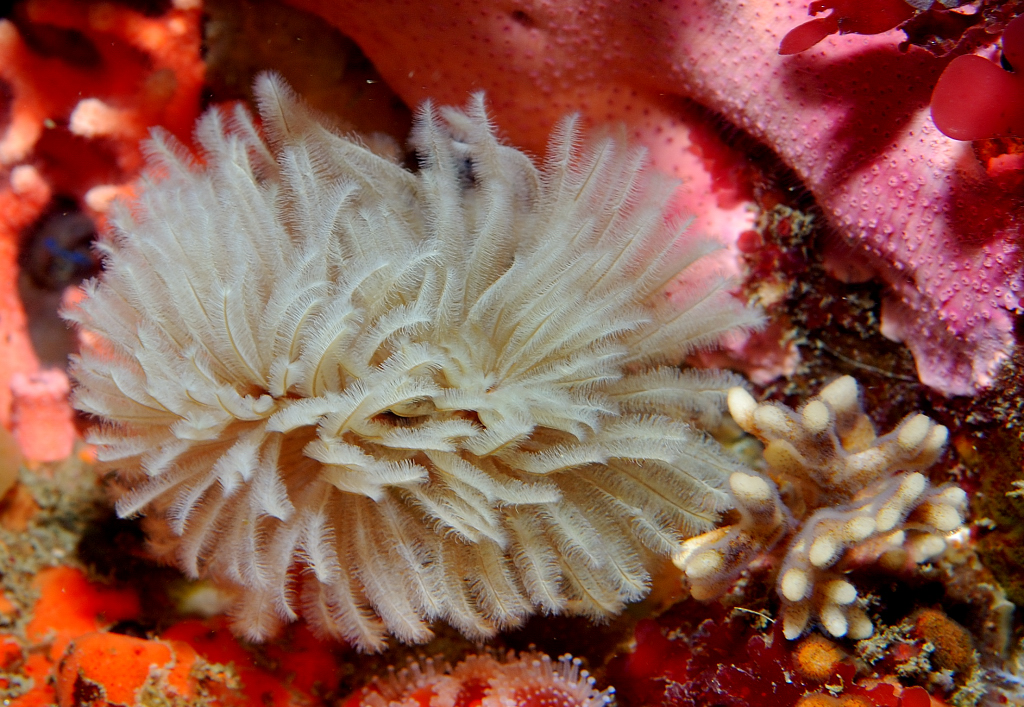
A sabellid, species unknown

== Genera ==
The following genera belong to the family:

- Acromegalomma
- Amphicorina
- Amphiglena
- Anamobaea
- Aracia
- Bispira
- Branchiomma
- Chone
- Claviramus
- Clymeneis
- Desdemona
- Dialychone
- Euchone
- Eudistylia
- Euratella
- Fabricia
- Fabriciola
- Glomerula
- Haplobranchus
- Hypsicomus
- Jasmineira
- Laonome
- Manayunkia
- Megalomma
- Myxicola
- Notaulax
- Novafabricia
- Oriopsis
- Panoumethus
- Panousea
- Parasabella
- Perkinsiana
- Potamethus Chamberlin, 1919
- Potamilla
- Pseudobranchiomma
- Pseudofabricia
- Pseudofabriciola
- Pseudopotamilla
- Sabella
- Sabellastarte
- Sabellomma
- Sabellonga
- Schizobranchia
- Terebrasabella
