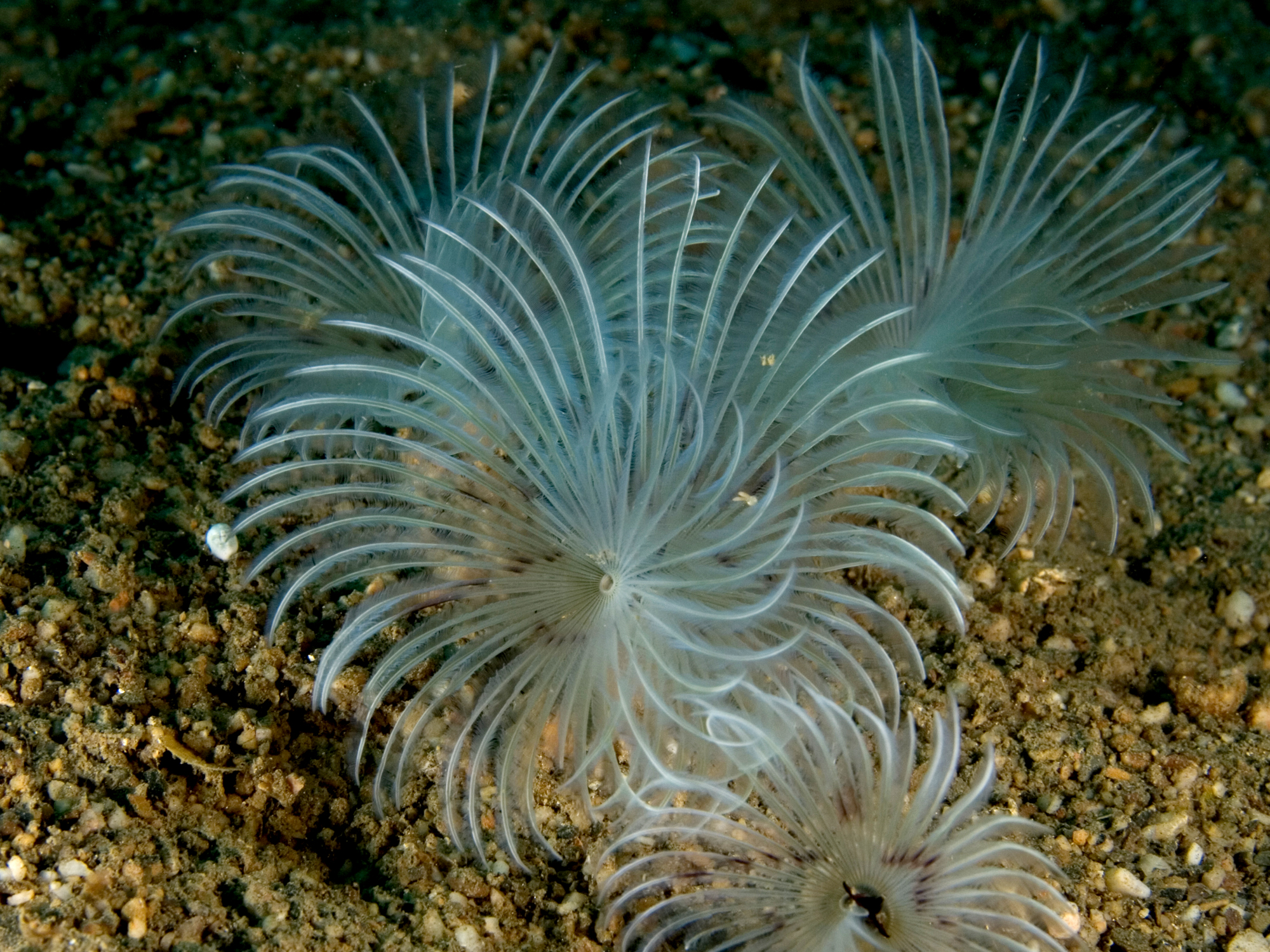
- Bispira sp.

Scientific classification
- Kingdom: Animalia
- Phylum: Annelida
- Clade: Pleistoannelida
- Clade: Sedentaria
- Infraclass: Canalipalpata
- Order: Sabellida; G.M.R. Levinsen, 1883

Families
- Fabriciidae; Sabellidae; Serpulidae; Siboglinidae

= Sabellida =

Sabellida Temporal range: Middle Permian (Wordian)-Present Possible Miaolingian record

Order of annelids

Sabellida is an order of annelid worms formerly in the class Polychaeta. They are filter feeders with no buccal organ. The prostomium is fused with the peristomium and bears a ring of feathery feeding tentacles. They live in parchment-like tubes made of particles from their environment such as sand and shell fragments cemented together with mucus.

Members of the suborder include the feather duster worms (Sabellidae) and serpulid worms (Serpulidae). Among the species are the giant feather duster worm (Eudistylia polymorpha), the peacock worm (Sabella pavonina), the European fan worm (Sabella spallanzanii) and the Christmas tree worm (Spirobranchus giganteus). The inclusion of Oweniidae and Siboglinidae is not supported by some authorities.
