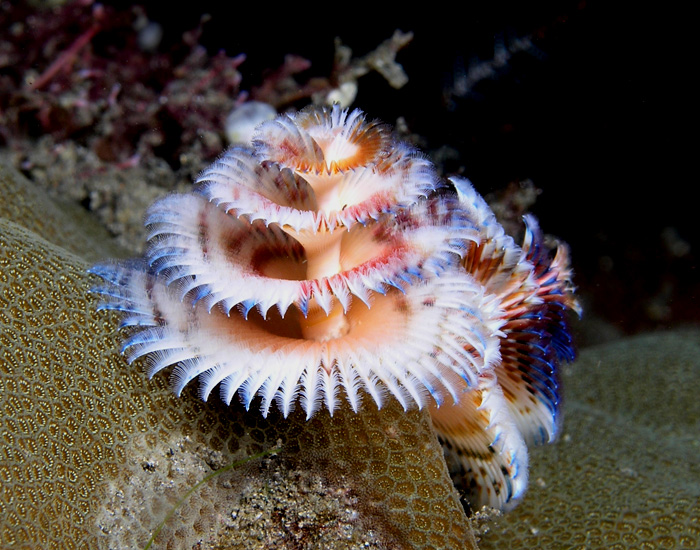
- Christmas tree worm (Spirobranchus giganteus) in East Timor.
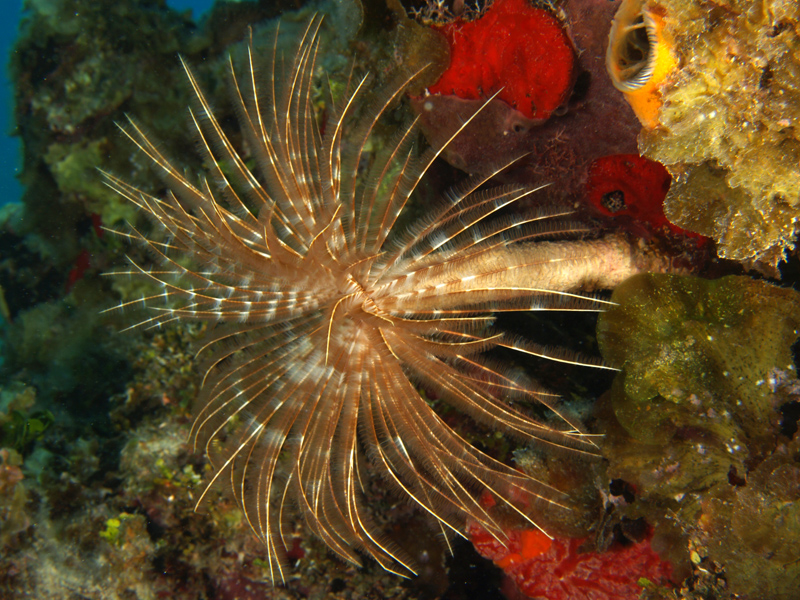
- Magnificent feather duster worm (Sabellastarte magnifica)

Scientific classification
- Kingdom: Animalia
- Phylum: Annelida
- Clade: Pleistoannelida
- Clade: Sedentaria
- Infraclass: Canalipalpata

Suborders
- See text

= Canalipalpata =

Order of annelid worms

Canalipalpata, also known as bristle-footed annelids or fan-head worms, is an order of polychaete worms consisting of 31 families such as the Serpulidae (tubeworms), Sabellidae (fanworms and feather duster worms), and Siboglinidae (beardworms) of the suborder Sabellida, and the Alvinellidae, a family of worms often associated with hydrothermal vents (though a number of Siboglinids also inhabit hydrothermal vents, like the giant tube worm Riftia pachyptila). Most canalipalpatans are considered to be tube worms, with some exceptions.

== Description ==
The Canalipalpata have no teeth or jaws. Most are filter feeders. They have grooved palpi, which are covered in cilia. These cilia are used to transport food particles to the mouth. However, the cilia and grooves have been lost in the Siboglinidae family.

The head of Canalipalpata is located at the anterior end of the body, and is formed by the fusion of a funnel-shaped, symmetrical peristomium with the prostomium. The prostomium bears a specialized mouth appendage which is referred to as a branchial crown. The crown functions as both a sieve and a gill. The animal can extend the crown from its calcareous tube for feeding and gas exchange, and rapidly retract it when disturbed or threatened.

=== Radiole ===
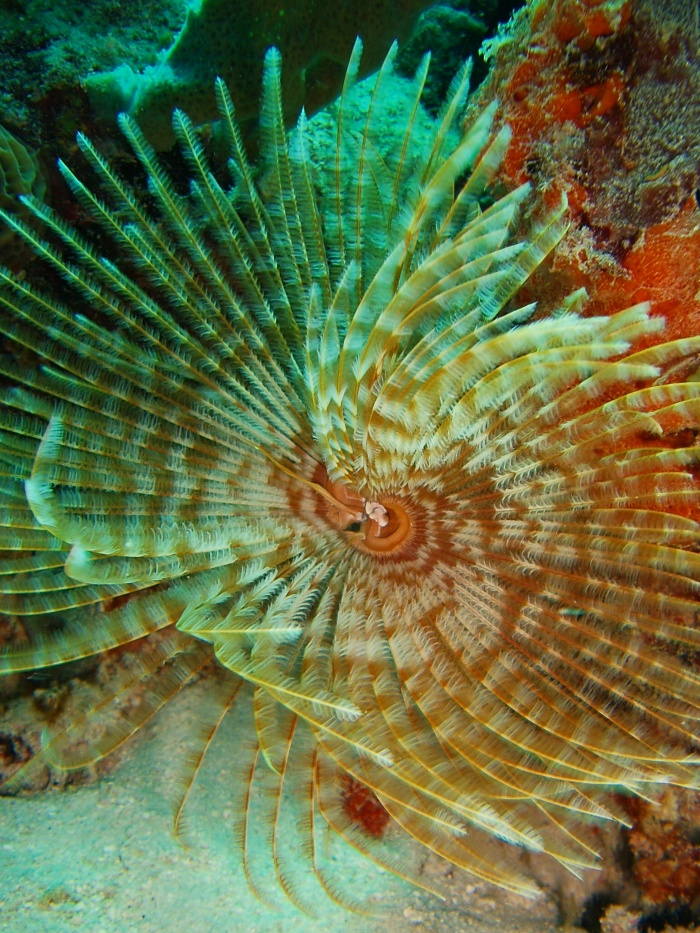
Radioles extending from the branchial stalk of a Spirographis feather duster worm

Radioles are heavily ciliated feather-like tentacle found in highly organized clusters on the crowns of Canalipalpata. The radioles are primarily for alimentation, being used for filter feeding, though these also serve as respiratory organs. Because of their role in gas exchange, radioles are often referred to as "gills".

The radioles (or sometimes branchiae; Ancient Greek for gills) forms the crown, which consists of two radiole bundles (one right and one left). Each of these bundles consists of a single row of radioles attached to a branchial stalk and curved into a semicircle. These two semicircles form the funnel-shaped branchial crown. The mouth is located at the apex (top) of the funnel, between the two branchial stalks.

The radioles of Canalipalpata vary widely in color across species; those of the serpulid tubeworms are typically red, pink, or orange in color, with white transverse bands. Astaxanthin, a carotenoid pigment, is responsible for the bright red color of the crown of Serpula vermicularis.

In addition to "ordinary" radioles, some Canalipalpata possess one or more highly modified radioles located on the dorsal part of the head; These are the operculum, which is a cone-shaped cartilagenous structure located at the distal end of a long cartilaginous stalk. When threatened or disturbed, the animal withdraws rapidly into its protective calcareous tube and employs the operculum as a "plug" to occlude (close) the entrance to the tube. The operculum, which is usually similar in color to the other radioles, secretes a mucus which seems to possess antibiotic properties. It is not unusual for the worms to have two crowns, and hence two opercula. Serpulids and sabellids are two families of the Sabellida suborder of Canalipalpata tubeworms that are very similar morphologically, but they can be readily distinguished by the fact that while both have radioles, the sabellids (such as Sabella pavonina) lack an operculum.

==== Function ====
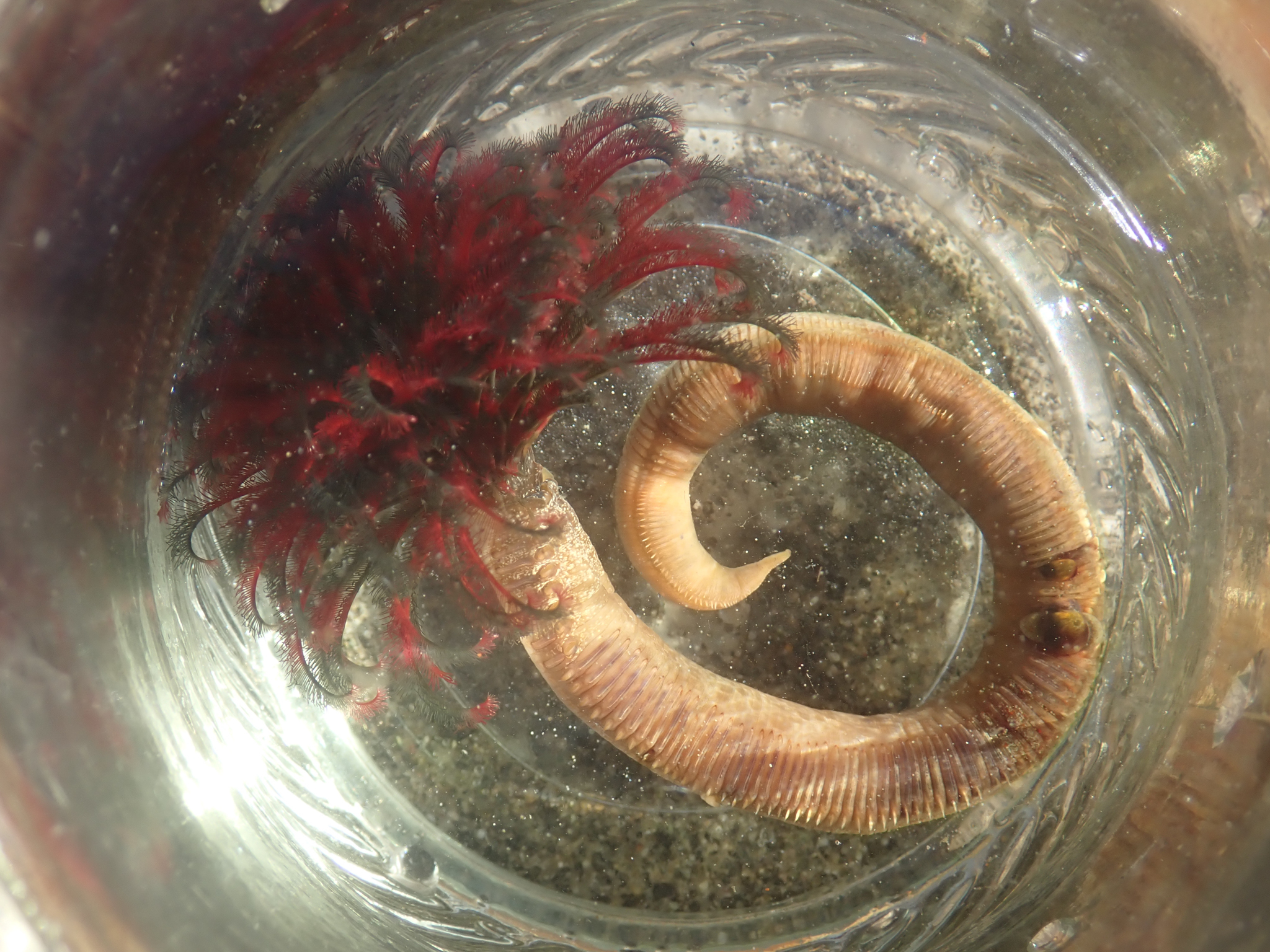
Eudistylia vancouveri outside of its tube

An adult worm typically has about 40 radioles in its crown, with their ventral surfaces covered by tiny, hair-like branches called cilia. This arrangement gives the crown the appearance of a small fan or feather duster (for which the animals are often referred to as fanworms, or feather duster worms). When extended, these heavily ciliated radioles trap particles of organic matter and transport them towards the mouth; the radioles rhythmically move in such a way as to create a current in the surrounding water column which carries planktonic particles from the underside of the crown upwards through the net of radioles to the dorsal surface.

The dorsal or upper side of each radiole has a ciliated longitudinal radiolar food groove running down its center, extending along its longitudinal axis from the tip to the center of the crown. Planktonic food particles are swept into these grooves, where they become trapped in a coating of mucus. At this point, the animal subjects the particles to an examination and selection process, whereby any particles determined to be unsuitable due to size or chemical composition are rejected by the animal and discarded back into the water column. Once the selection process is complete, the cilia transport the particles towards the mouth, from where they enter the digestive tract.

While they are primarily feeding structures, the radioles also serve as respiratory organs.

==== Growth and regeneration ====
Smaller bodied worms, such as juvenile, have small crowns and radioles, and so capture and eat very small particles, such as bacterioplankton and single-celled phytoplankton and zooplankton. As a worm matures and grows in size, so does its crown. The larger crown allows the animal to feed on larger multicellular plankton. The preferred food size depends on the maximum size achieved by the adult worm.

Canalipalpata worms often lose one or more radioles, or even the entire crown as a result of predation by other animals or other physical trauma. Some species even appear to have the ability to control the loss of their tentacular crowns through autotomy, in much the same manner as when a lizard loses its tail. In certain circumstances, sacrifice of the crown may permit escape or confer some other benefit to the animal. Separation of the crown occurs at a pre-established zone of abscission, located at the base of the crown. Any would-be predators that pass by after a worm has lost its crown will get the impression that the worm has died; this protects the animal from further attack. After amputation, Canalipalpata have the ability to regenerate new radioles or even the entire crown if necessary. The crown typically reappears after about two weeks. When it does reappear, it is initially smaller in size, but it eventually grows back to its former size and color.

== Fossil record ==
The earliest known member of the Canalipalpata is Terebellites franklini, which was found in the Clouds Rapids Formation of Newfoundland, and dates from the mid Cambrian (St David's series).

== Taxonomy ==
Order Canalipalpata Rouse & Fauchald, 1997 non Linnaean

- Order Sabellida
  - Fabriciidae Rioja, 1923
  - Sabellidae Latreille, 1825 (Feather duster worms)
  - Serpulidae Rafinesque, 1815
  - Siboglinidae Caullery, 1914 (Beard worms)
- Order Spionida
  - Suborder Spioniformia
    - Apistobranchidae Mesnil & Caullery, 1898
    - Poecilochaetidae Hannerz, 1956
    - Spionidae Grube, 1850
    - Trochochaetidae Pettibone, 1963
    - Uncispionidae Green, 1982
- Order Terebellida
  - Suborder Cirratuliformia
    - Acrocirridae Banse, 1969
    - Cirratulidae Ryckholt, 1851
    - Fauveliopsidae Hartman, 1971
    - Flabelligeridae de Saint-Joseph, 1894
    - Longosomatidae Hartman, 1944
    - Sternaspidae Carus, 1863
  - Suborder Terebelliformia
    - Alvinellidae Desbruyères & Laubier, 1986
    - Ampharetidae Malmgren, 1866
    - Melinnidae Chamberlin, 1919
    - Pectinariidae Quatrefages, 1866 (Trumpet worms)
    - Terebellidae Johnston, 1846 (Spaghetti worms)
    - Trichobranchidae Malmgren, 1866
- Incertae sedis
  - Sabellariidae Johnston, 1865

== Gallery ==
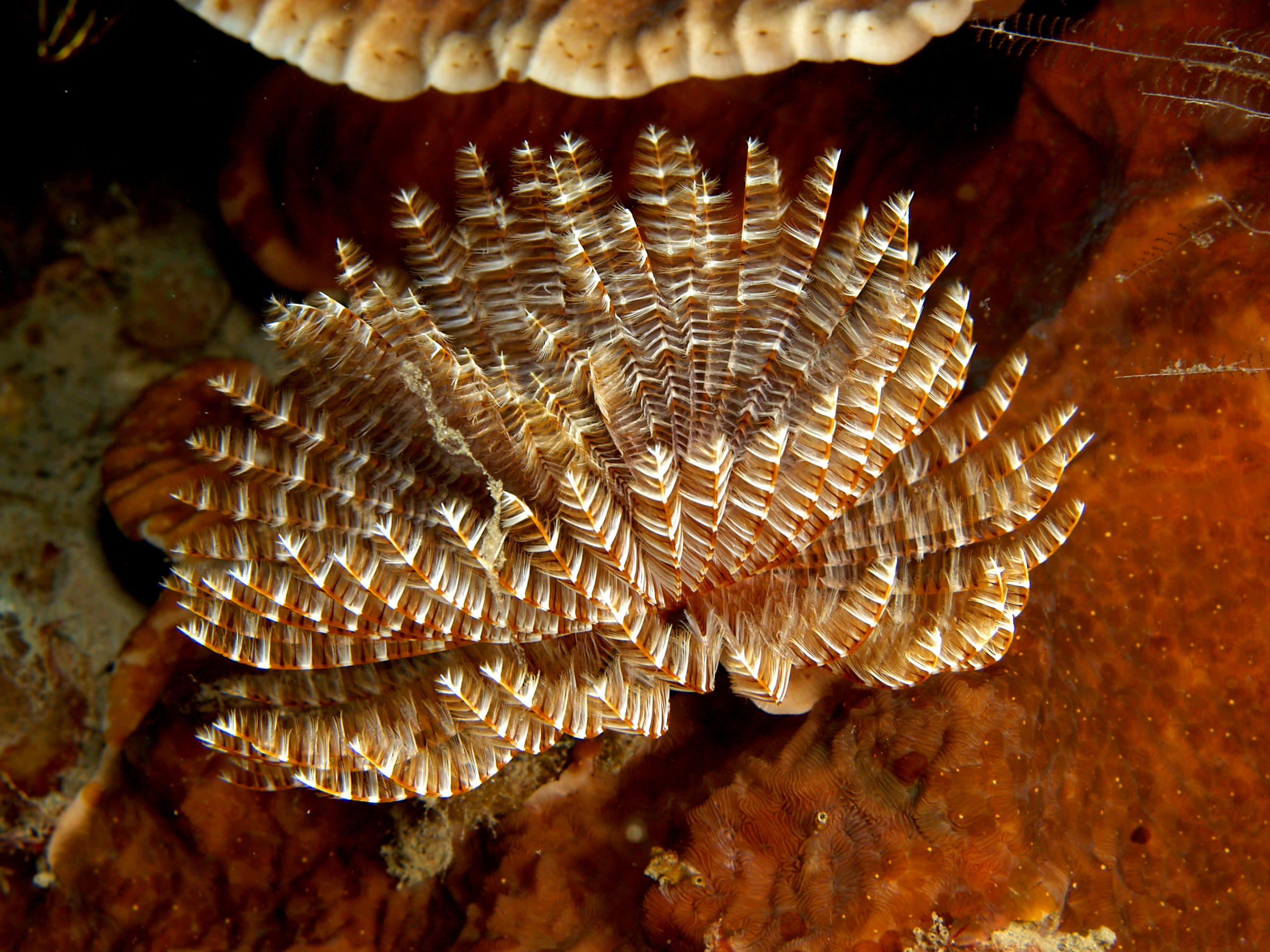
Sabellastarte indica (Indian feather duster worm)

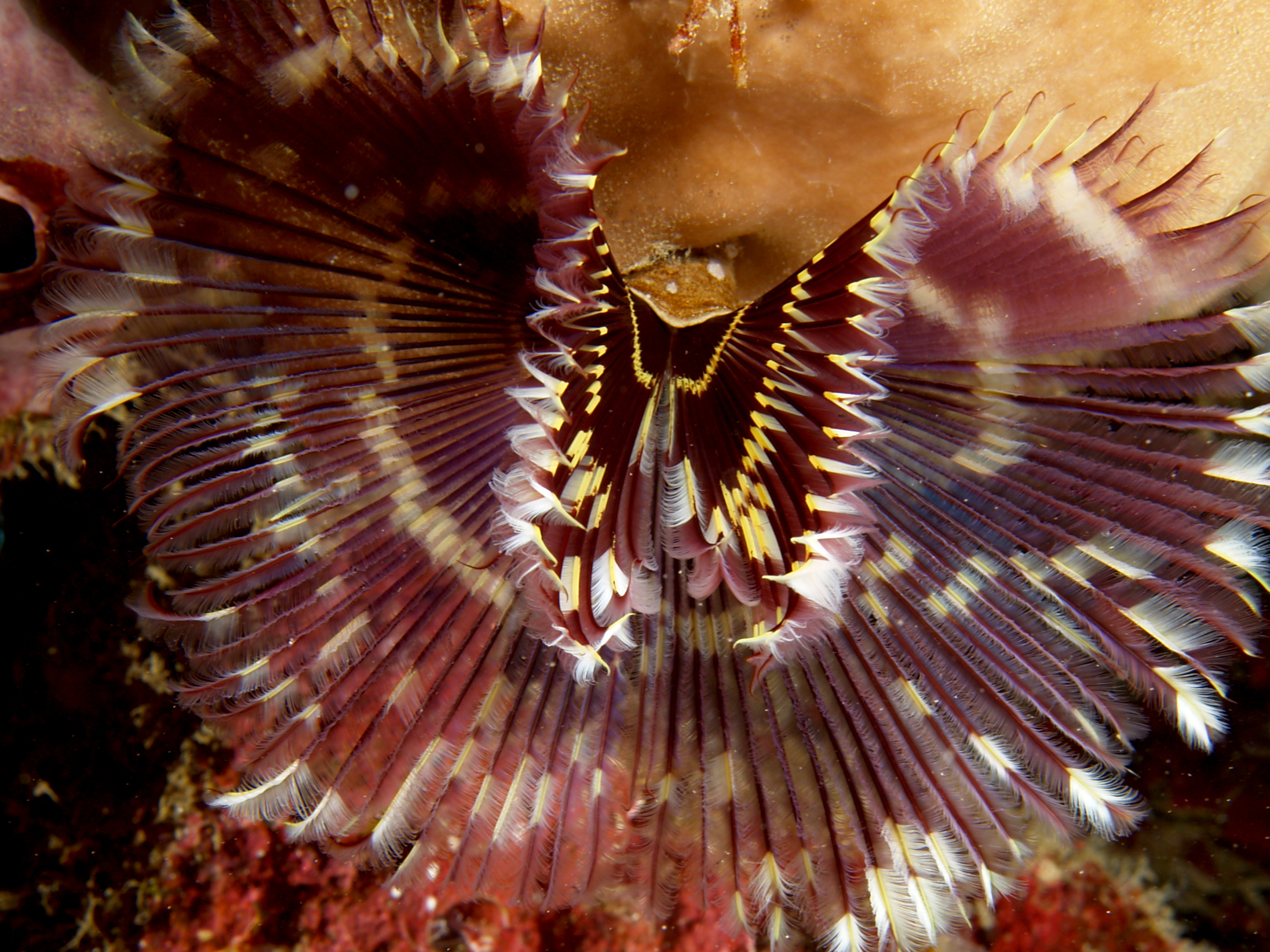
S. indica

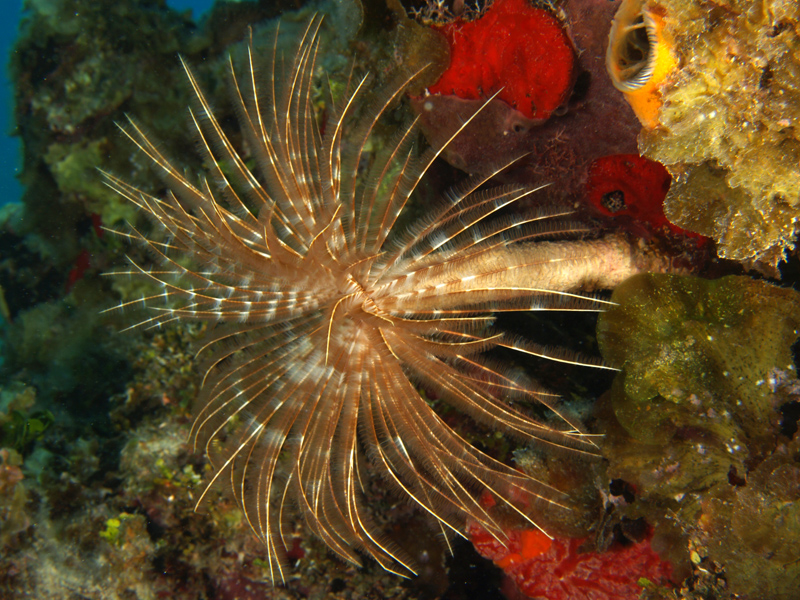
S. magnifica (magnificent feather duster worm)

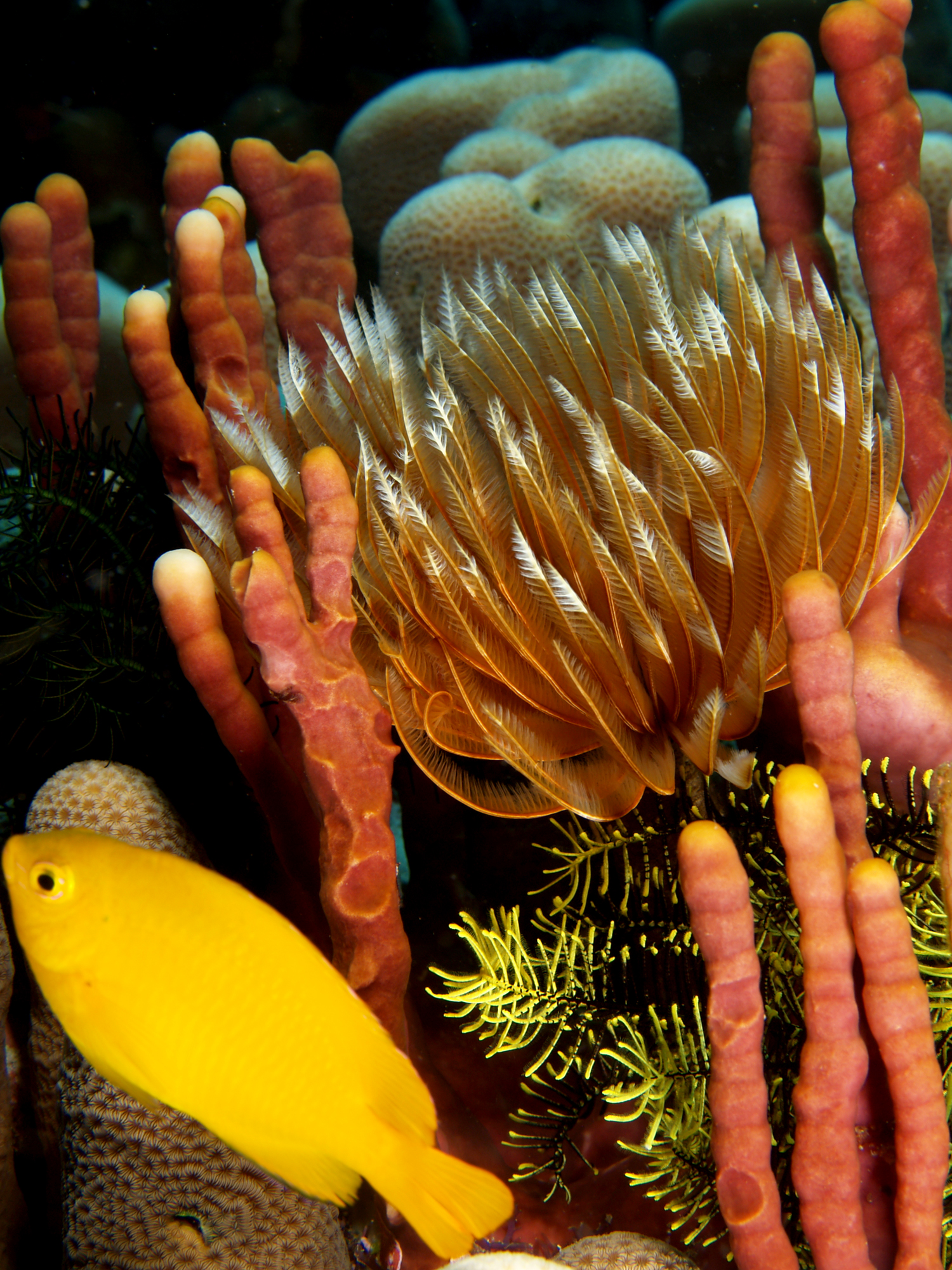
Sabellastarte sanctijosephi (St. Joseph's feather duster worm)

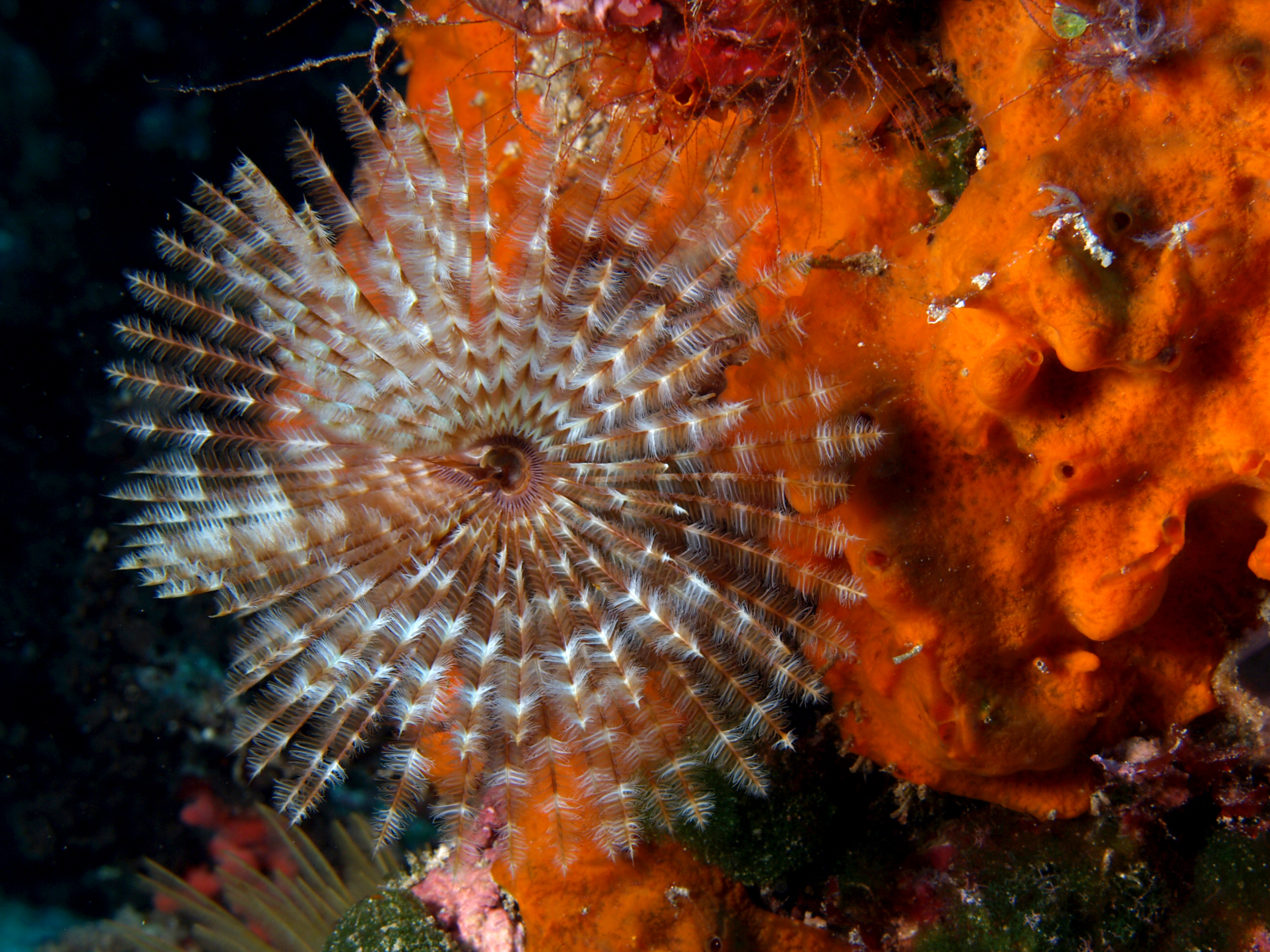
S. sanctijosephi

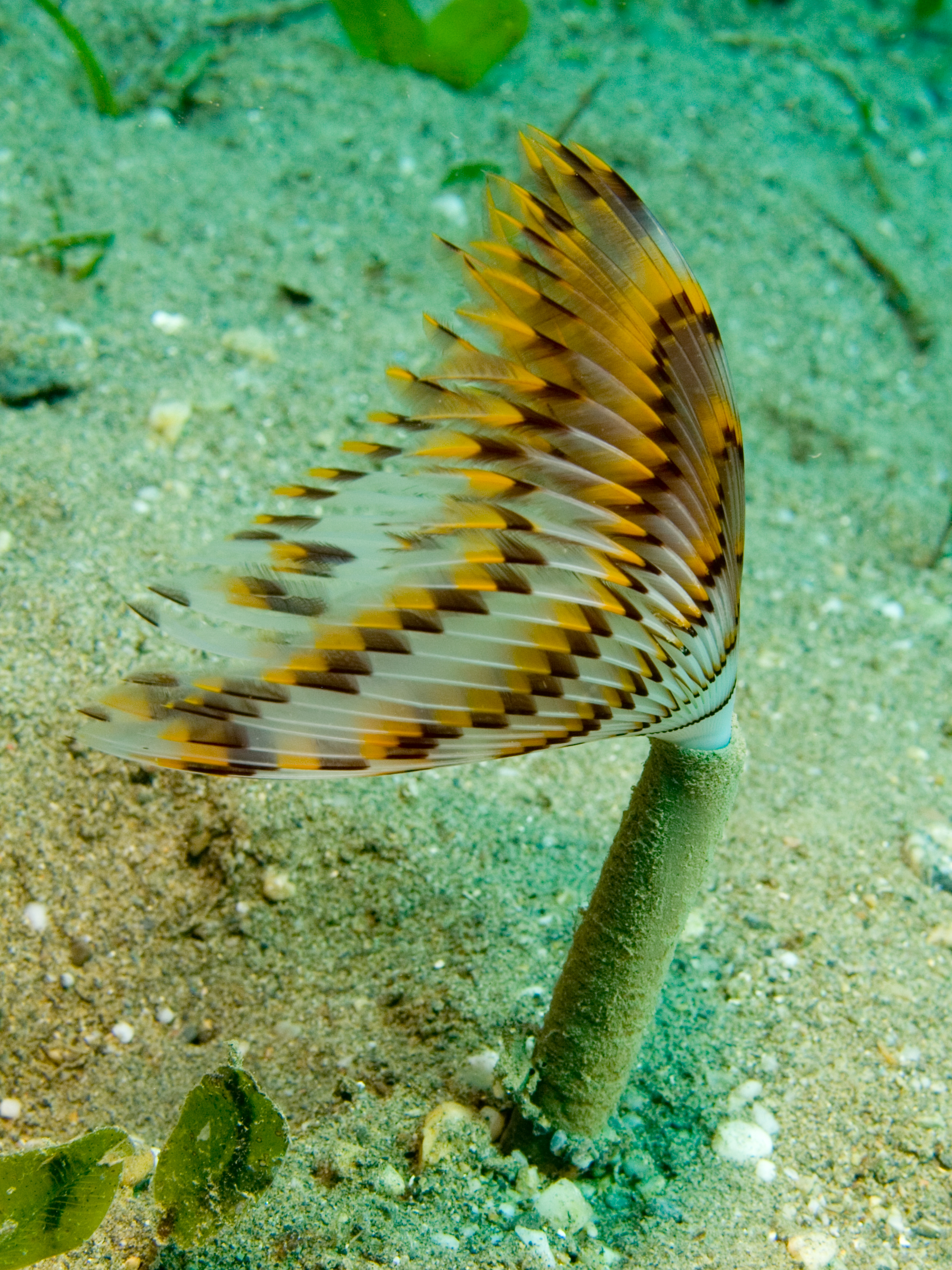
S. sanctijosephi

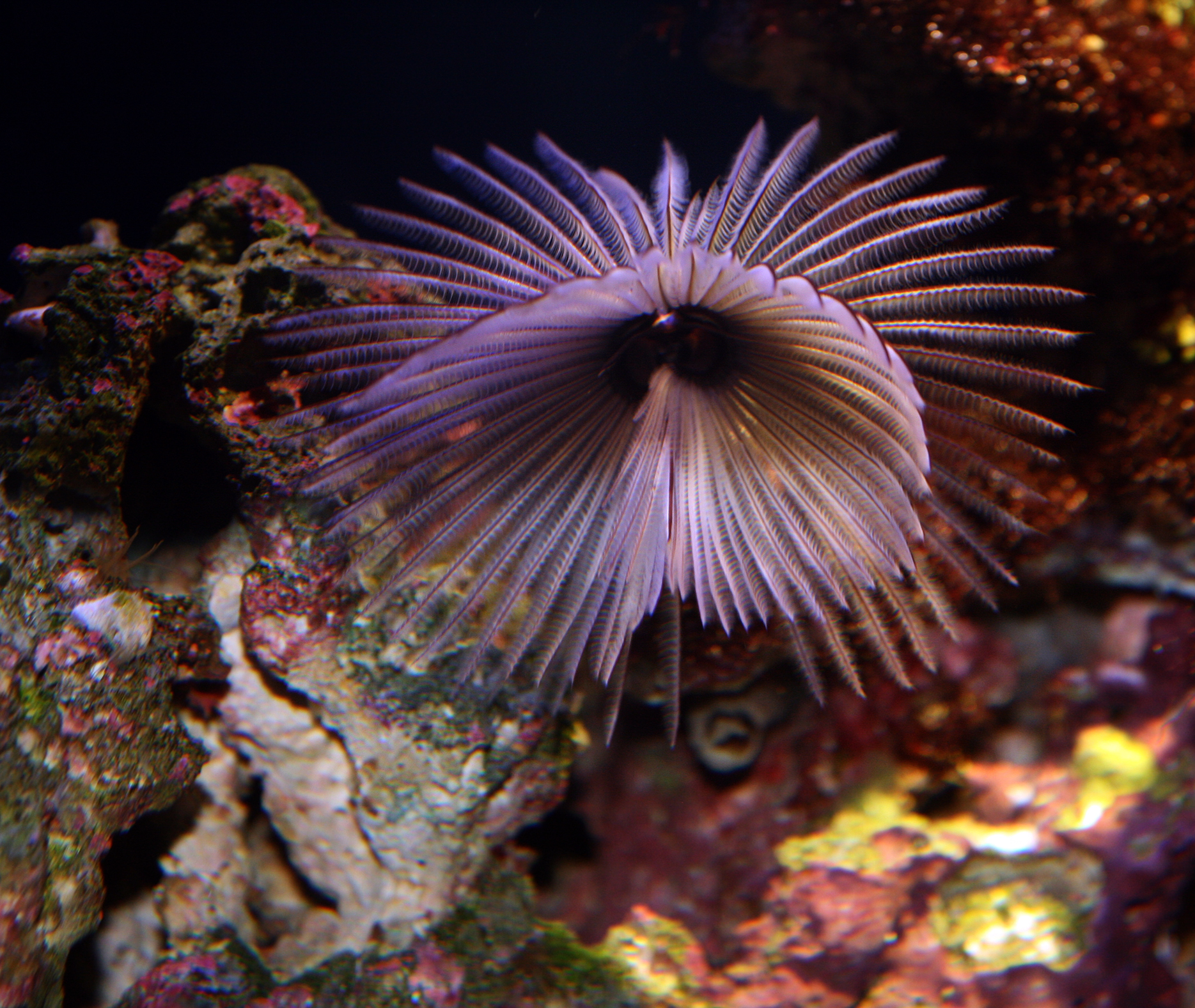
Sabellastarte sp. (feather duster worm)

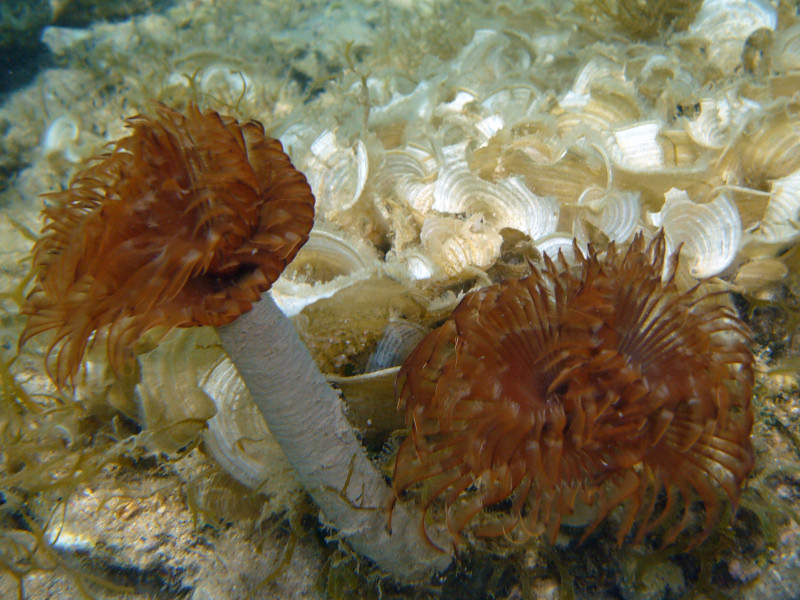
Sabella spallanzanii

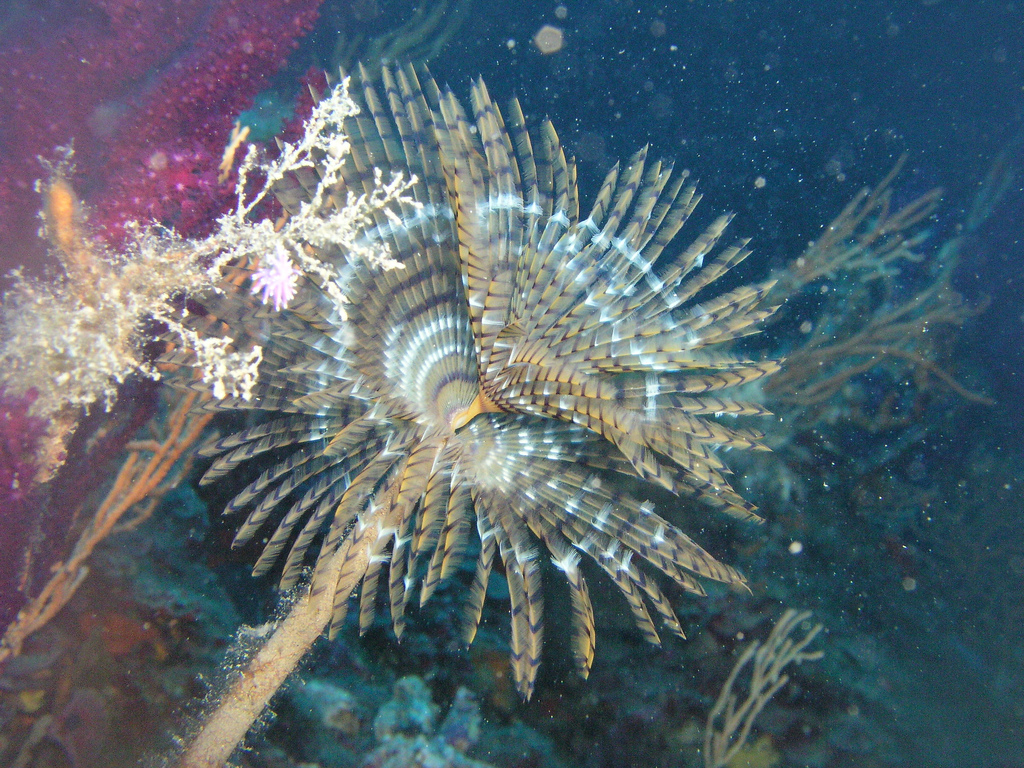
S. spallanzanii

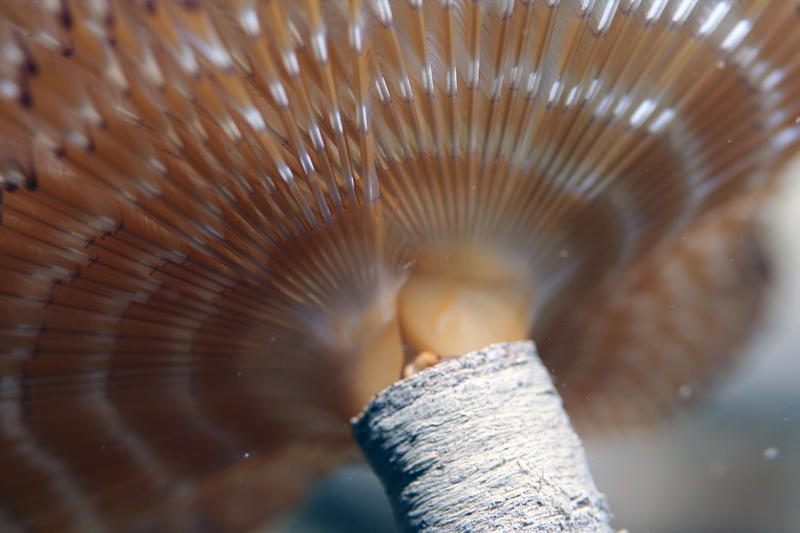
Spirographis sp.

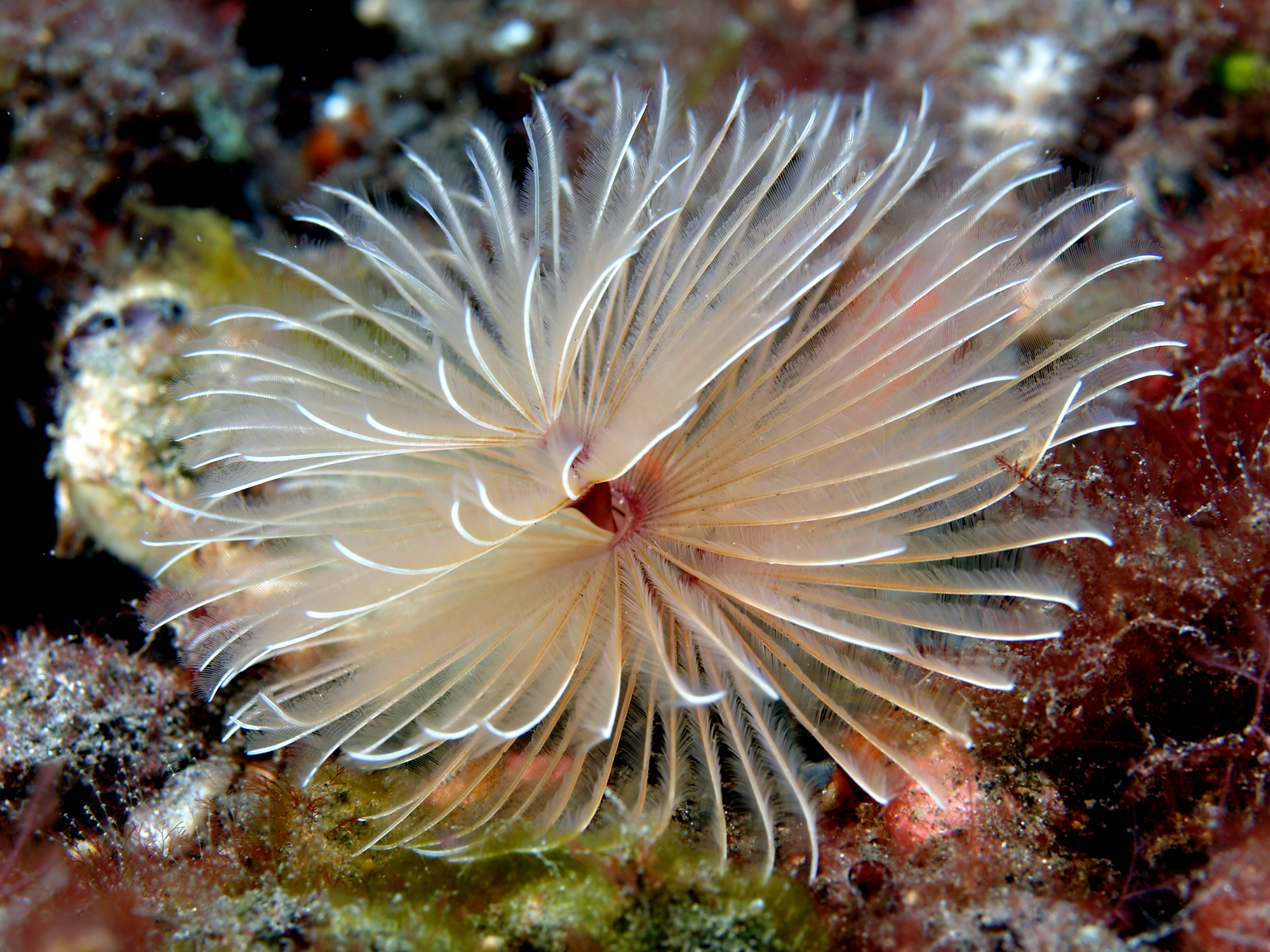
Bispira sp.

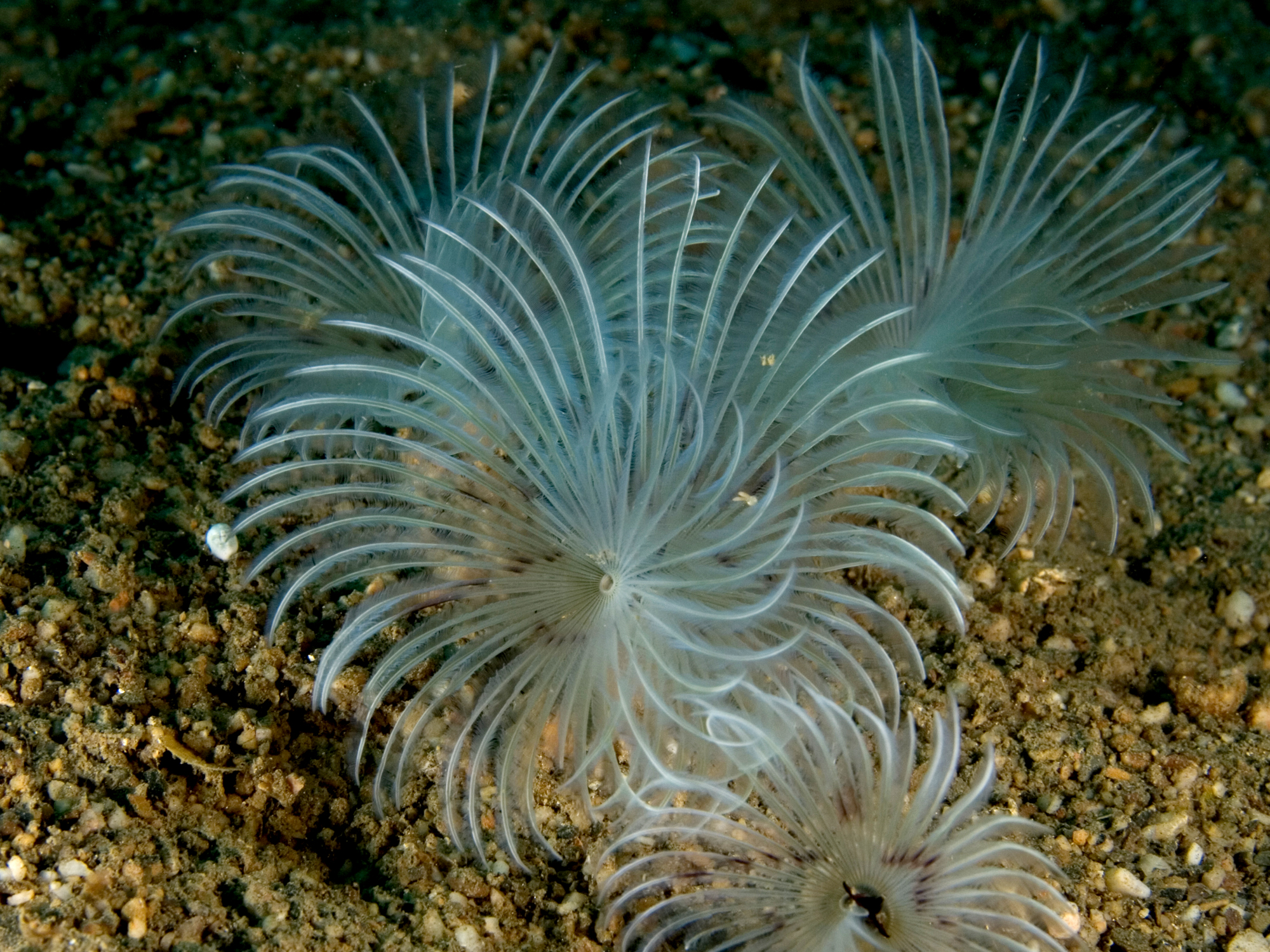
Bispira sp.

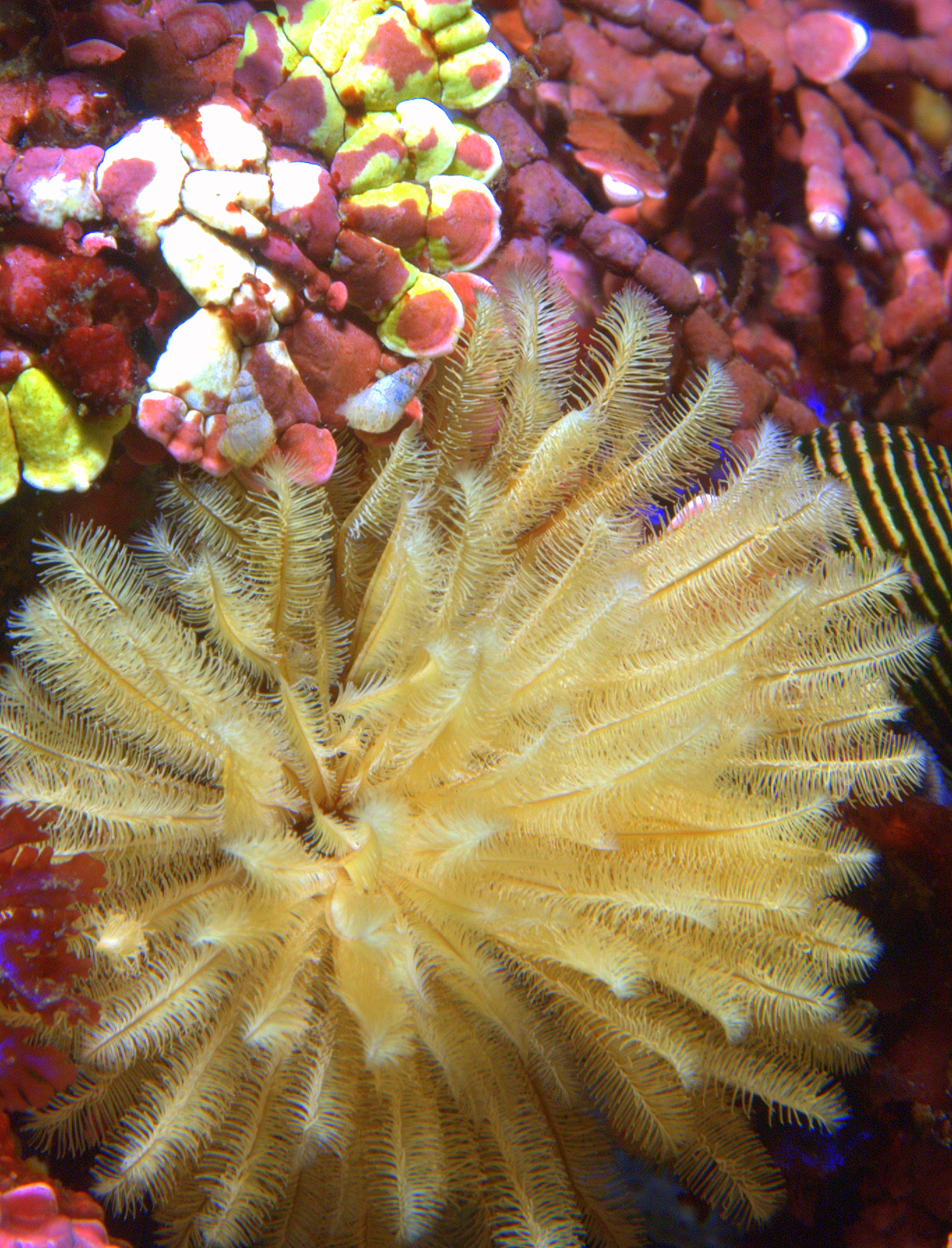
Sabellidae sp.

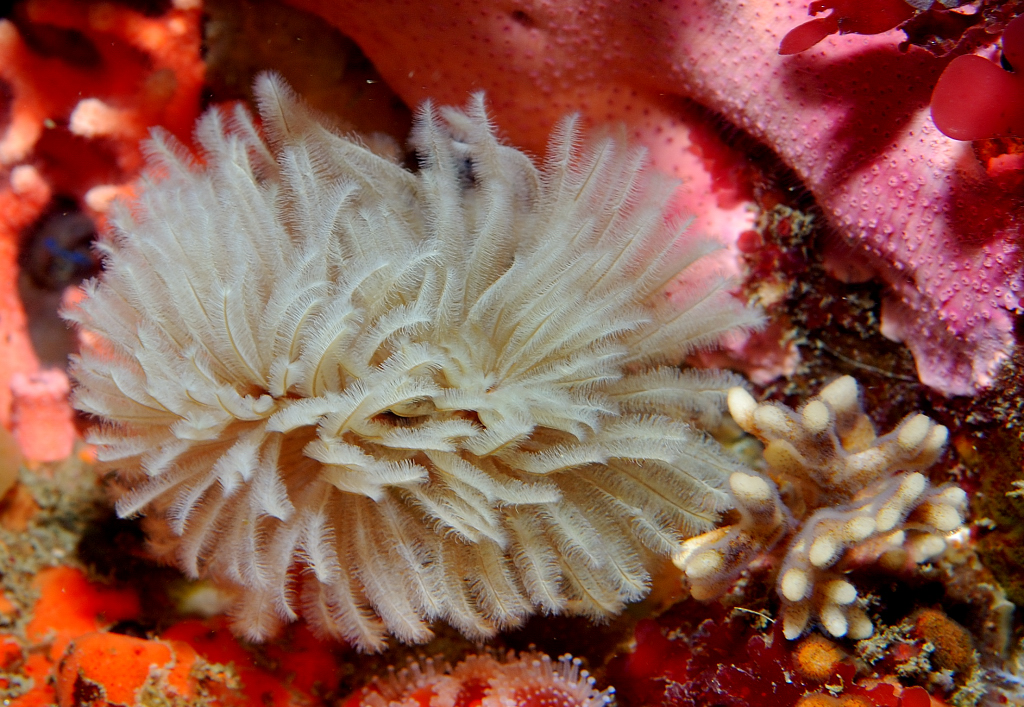
Sabellidae sp.

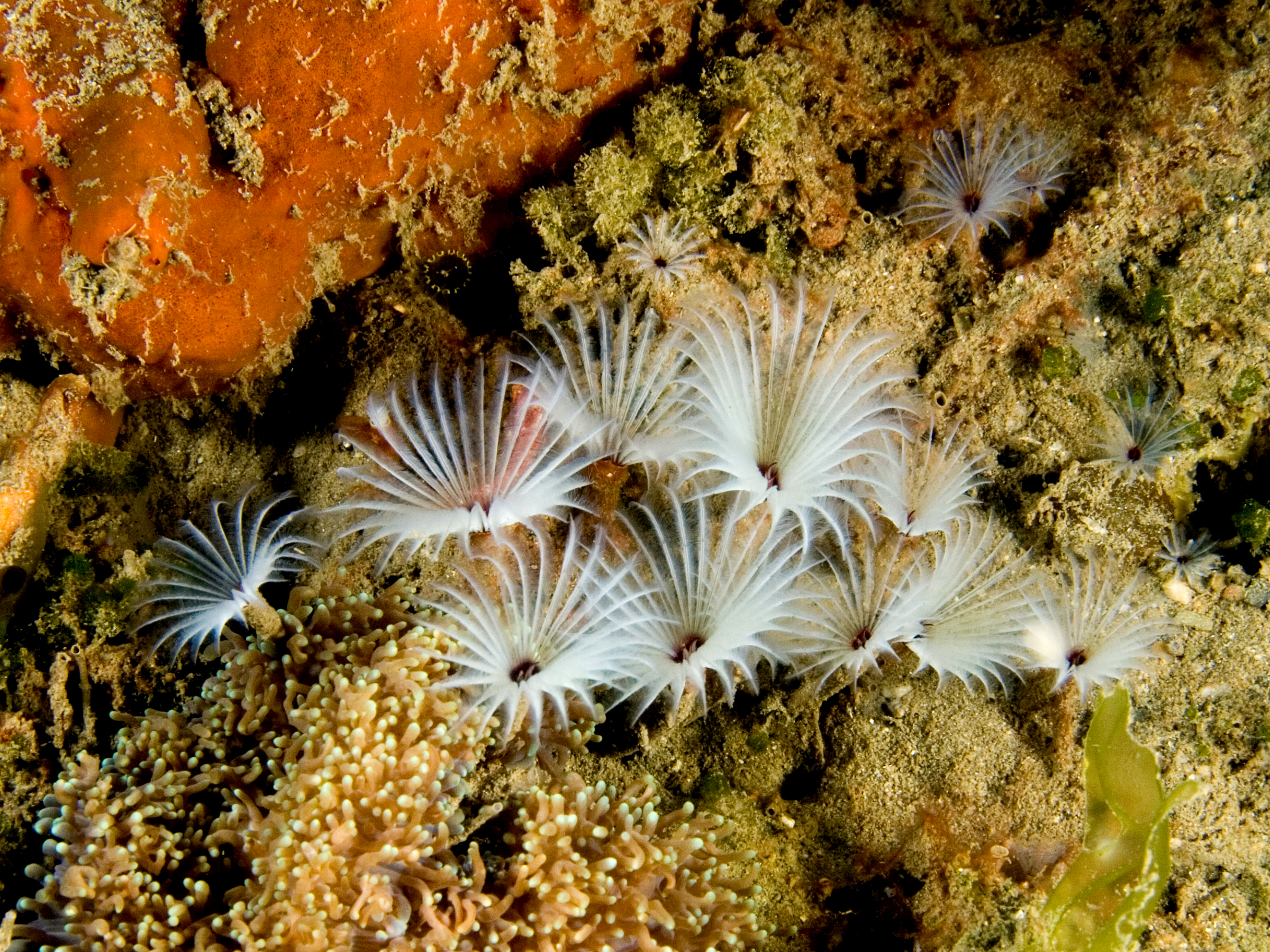
Sabellidae sp.

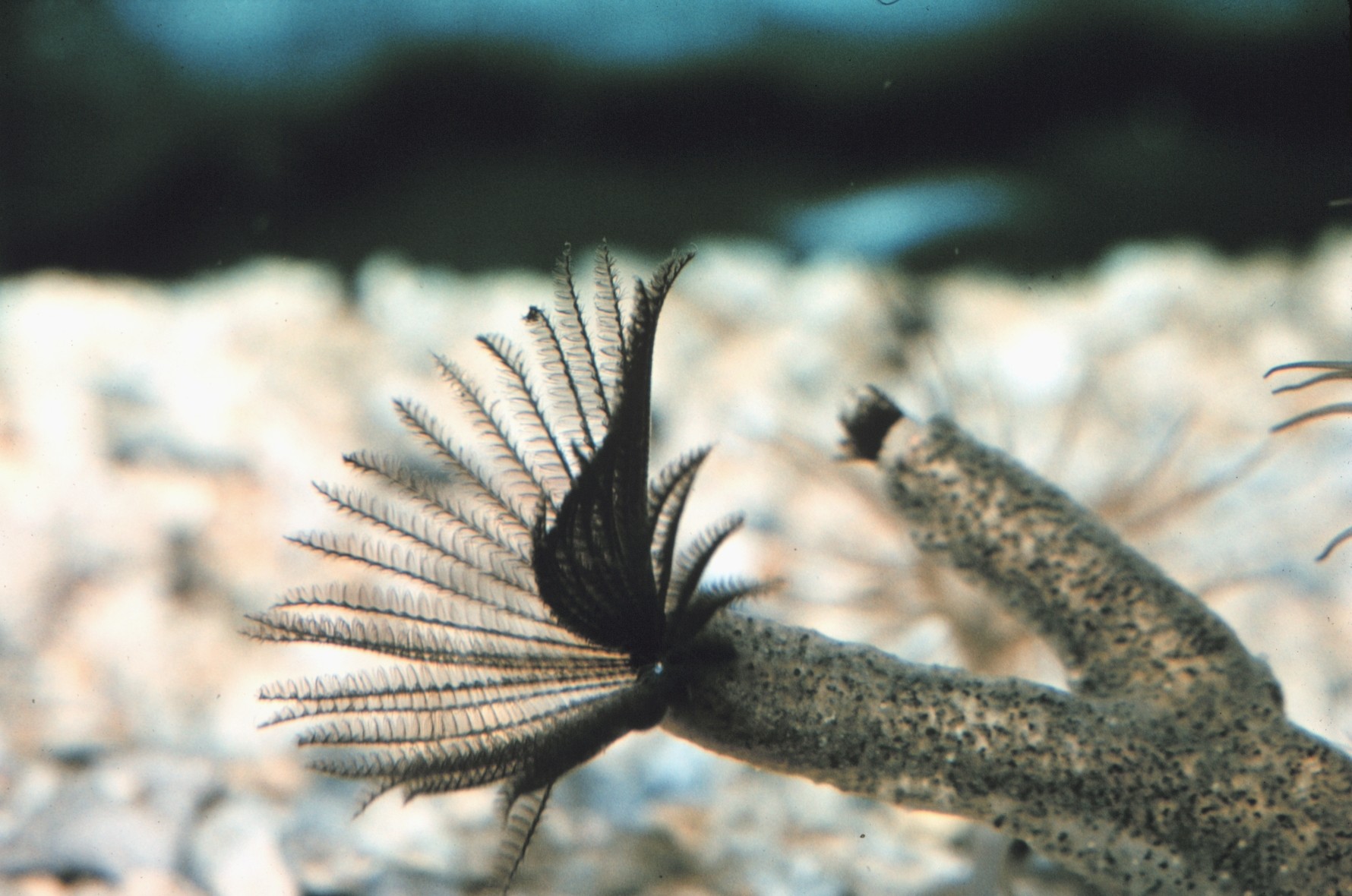
Sabellidae sp.

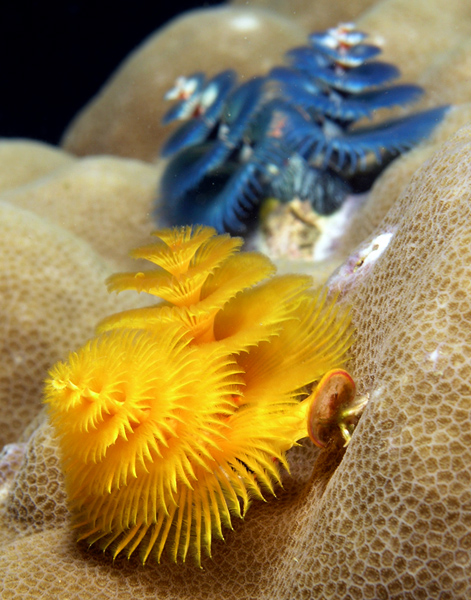
Spirobranchus giganteus (Christmas tree worms)
