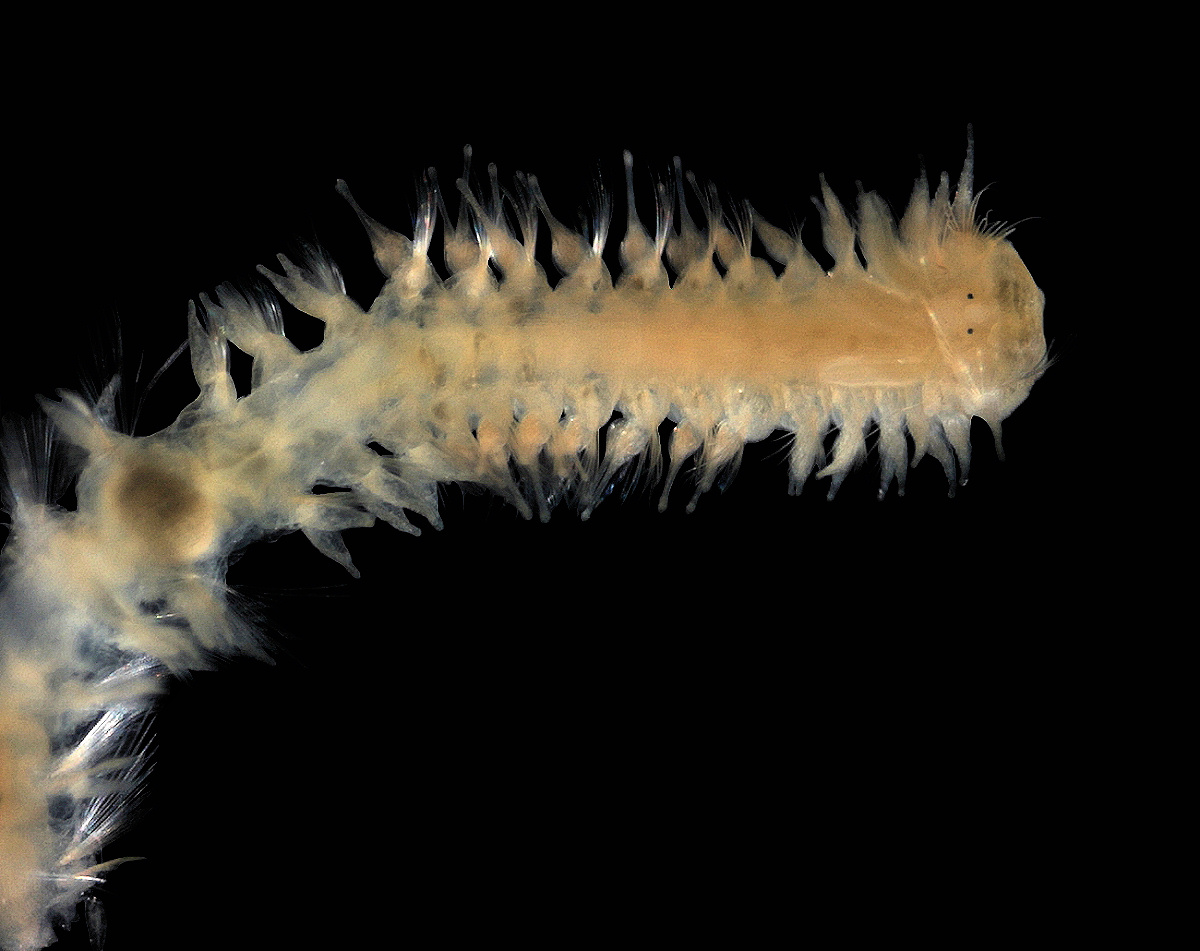

Scientific classification
- Kingdom: Animalia
- Phylum: Annelida
- Clade: Pleistoannelida
- Clade: Sedentaria
- Order: Spionida
- Family: Poecilochaetidae
- Genus: Poecilochaetus
- Species: P. serpens

Binomial name
- Poecilochaetus serpens Allen, 1904

= Poecilochaetus serpens =

Species of annelid worm

Poecilochaetus serpens is a species of marine polychaete worm in the family Poecilochaetidae. It is a benthic worm that burrows into soft sediment.

== Taxonomy and habitat ==
The British marine biologist Edgar Johnson Allen first described this worm in 1904, giving it the name Poecilochaetus serpens. It was originally found buried in the sand of a beach near Plymouth, England, at extreme low water of a spring tide; the shore here consists of patches of Zostera seagrass separated by patches of bare sand, and the worm was only ever found in the bare sand areas, nor was it ever found in other habitats near Plymouth. The specific name was chosen because when they were swimming, both the worm and its planktonic larvae were continually wriggling.

== Description ==
This segmented worm is long and slender. For example, a worm with 110 segments was 55 mm (2.2 in) in length and 1.6 mm (0.06 in) in width, exclusive of appendages. The prostomium (head) has a single tentacle ventrally. Behind the head are two long palps which can be extended forward, or coiled loosely, and which may be half the length of the body. The peristomium (first segment) bears the mouth and four simple eyes, and it and the next five segments are large, with parapodia (branched outgrowths) and smooth chaetae (bristles) projecting forward, and cirri (thread-like structures) projecting backwards. The next seven segments have spiny chaetae, and the remainder of the segments from segment 17 onwards bear chaetae that are large, feather-like bristles. The first 15 segments of this worm are translucent but appear bright red or purplish-red, depending on the degree of oxygenation of the blood; the remaining segments appear dark green or black, because of pigments in the gut cells.

== Ecology ==
Poecilochaetus serpens forms a U–shaped burrow in sand, the tube being lined by particles of clay or mud cemented with mucus; digging is performed by the head using the parapodial cirri attached to the first segment and associated long bristles. A water current is drawn through the tube by undulations of the body and fan-like movements of the parapodia and bristles. The worm can turn around in its tube, and then the current direction is reversed. The worm probably feeds on plankton and organic particles removed from the water current, and diatoms have been found in its gut.
