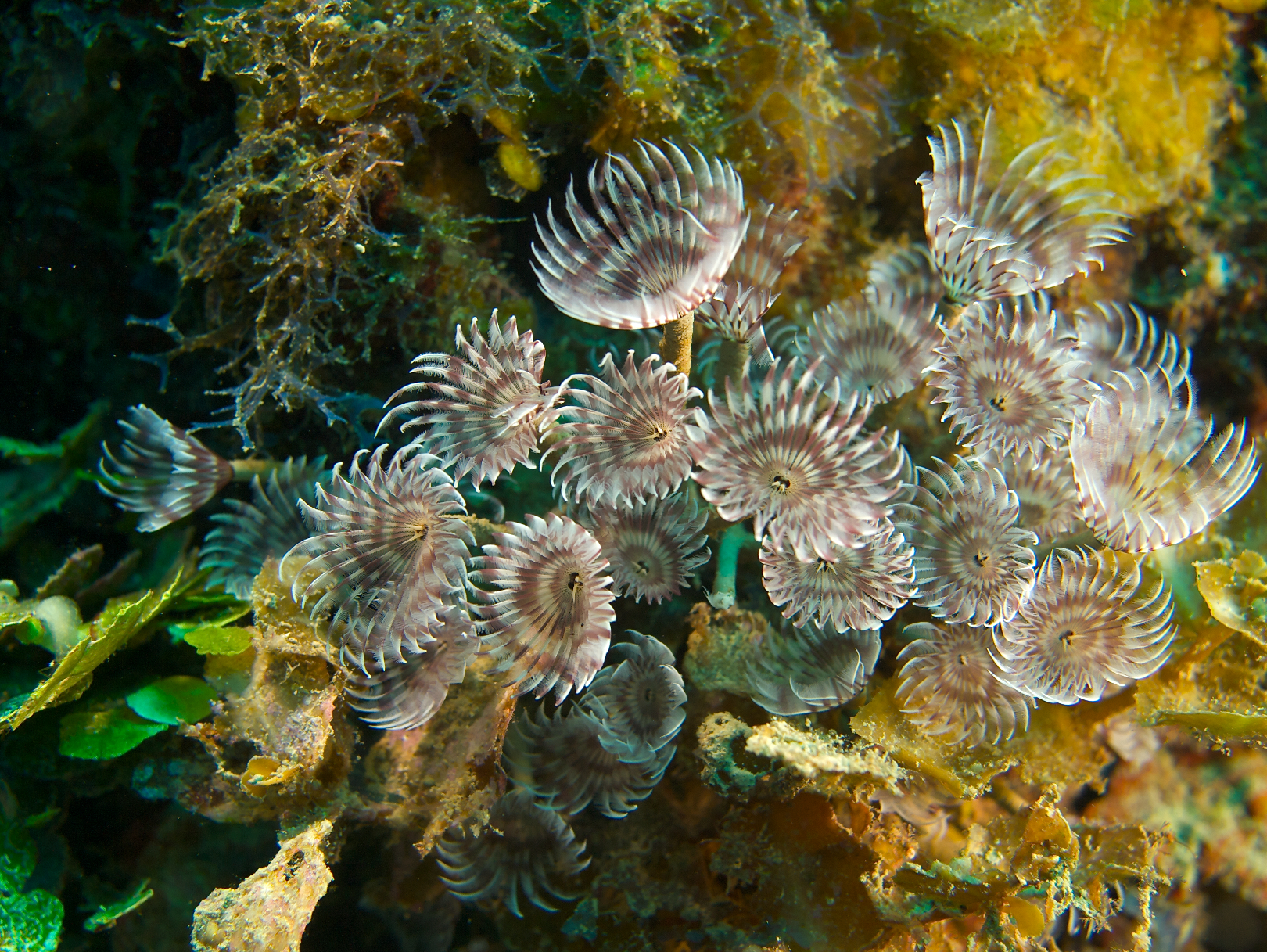

Scientific classification
- Kingdom: Animalia
- Phylum: Annelida
- Clade: Pleistoannelida
- Clade: Sedentaria
- Order: Sabellida
- Family: Sabellidae
- Genus: Bispira
- Species: B. brunnea

Binomial name
- Bispira brunnea (Treadwell, 1917)

Synonyms
- Metalaonome brunnea Treadwell, 1917; Sabella bahamensis Augener, 1922

= Bispira brunnea =

Species of annelid (marine bristleworm)

Bispira brunnea, the social feather duster or cluster duster, is a species of marine bristleworm. They tend to live in groups of individuals, and are common off the Caribbean islands in southeast North America. The feather duster has one crown of various colors, however, the color of the crown seems to be consistent within individual colonies.

== Taxonomy ==
This worm was first described in 1917 by the American zoologist Aaron Louis Treadwell, a specialist in annelids, who gave it the name Metalaonome brunnea. It was later transferred to the genus Bispira, becoming Bispira brunnea. The type locality is somewhere in the Bahamas.

== Description ==
Like other worms in the family Sabellidae, Bispira brunnea secretes itself a soft, non-calcareous tube, about 40 mm (1.6 in) in length from which it projects when feeding and into which it can retract. The tube is cemented to a hard surface, such as coral or rock, and white sand grains are cemented to the outside, using secretions from a gland just behind the worm's head. The trunk is segmented and the head bears the mouth, the sensory organs and a crown of radioles (feather-like tentacles). There are 18 to 28 radioles arranged in two semicircular whorls.

This worm tends to grow in colonial groups; the crowns of radioles sway together with movements of the water, and when one is stimulated to retract, the others do likewise. They are sensitive to vibrations in the water and thus difficult to observe. Colours are very variable, but the individuals in each group tend to have similar colourings; brown, orange, purple or banded, and often darker in the centre.

== Distribution and habitat ==
This worm is found throughout the Caribbean region and around the Bahamas and is often common. The tubes grow on rocks, corals and sandy sediment, under overhangs and in crevices, at depths down to about 35 m (115 ft). They prefer areas with vigorous water movement where there is plenty of suspended organic material and plankton.

== Ecology ==
Bispira brunnea feeds on plankton which are filtered from the water by the radioles. Lubricated by mucus, small pinnules move the food particles down a groove in the radiole to the worm's mouth in the centre of the crown. Whole colonies are either male, female or hermaphrodite. It is likely that these worms are protandrous hermaphrodites, starting life as males and becoming females when they are larger. If the crown is nipped off by a predator, it is able to regenerate in a few weeks.
