= S. spectabilis =

S. spectabilis may refer to:

- Sabellastarte spectabilis, a marine worm species
- Saproscincus spectabilis, a lizard species
- Selenidera spectabilis, the yellow-eared toucanet, a bird species
- Senna spectabilis, a flowering plant species
- Solaster spectabilis, a starfish species
- Solidago spectabilis, a flowering plant species
- Somateria spectabilis, the king eider, a duck species
- Streptomyces spectabilis, a bacterium species
