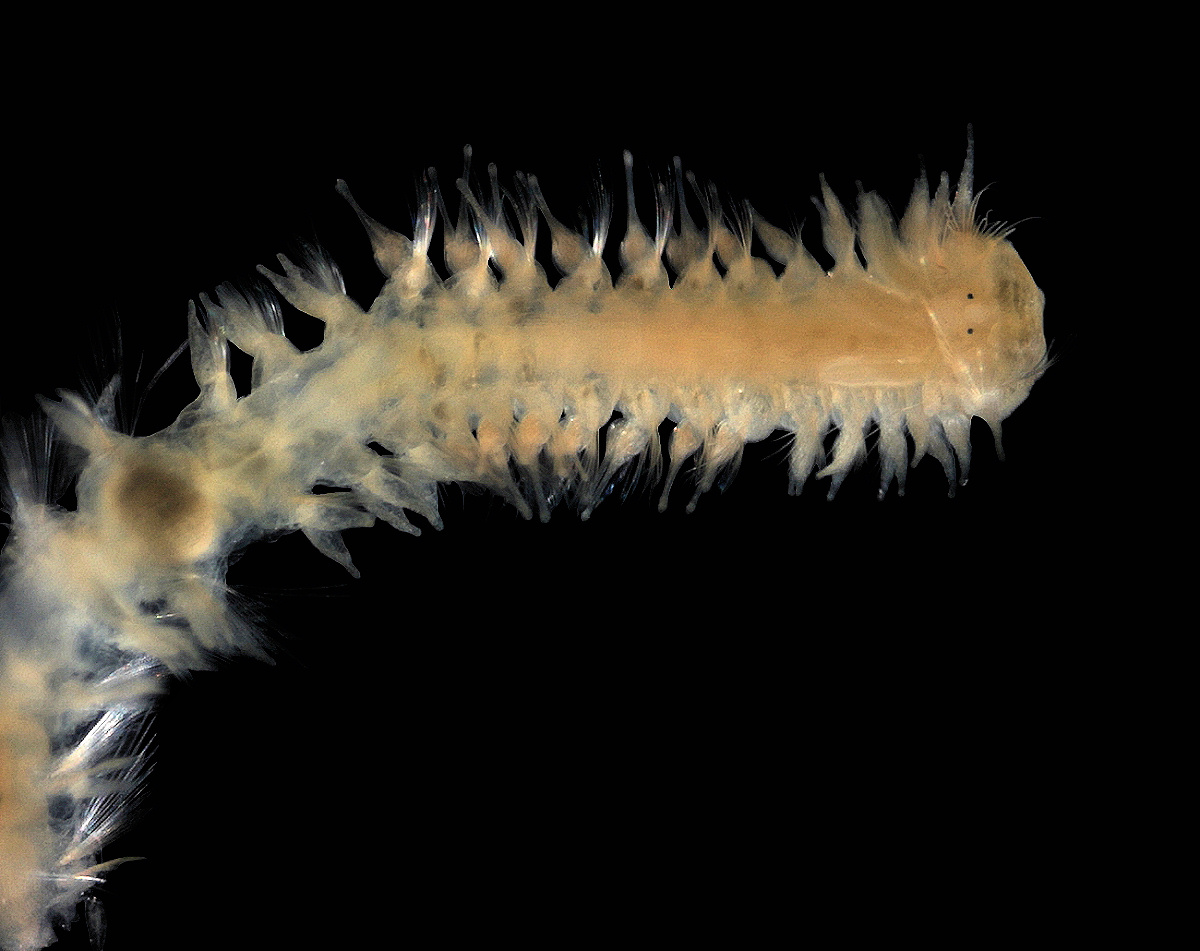
- Poecilochaetus serpens

Scientific classification
- Kingdom: Animalia
- Phylum: Annelida
- Clade: Pleistoannelida
- Clade: Sedentaria
- Order: Spionida
- Family: Poecilochaetidae
- Genus: Poecilochaetus; Hannerz, 1956

Species
- See text

= Poecilochaetus =

Genus of annelids

Poecilochaetus is a genus of marine worms within the Polychaeta. It is the only genus in the monotypic family Poecilochaetidae. Members of this genus are benthic worms that burrow into soft sediments.

== Species ==
The World Register of Marine Species lists the following species:-

- Poecilochaetus australis Nonato, 1963
- Poecilochaetus bermudensis Hartman, 1965
- Poecilochaetus bifurcatus Imajima, 1989
- Poecilochaetus clavatus Imajima, 1989
- Poecilochaetus elongatus Imajima, 1989
- Poecilochaetus exmouthensis Hartmann-Schröder, 1980
- Poecilochaetus fauchaldi Pilato & Cantone, 1976
- Poecilochaetus fulgoris Claparède in Ehlers, 1875
- Poecilochaetus gallardoi Pilato & Cantone, 1976
- Poecilochaetus granulatus Imajima, 1989
- Poecilochaetus hystricosus Mackie, 1990
- Poecilochaetus ishikariensis Imajima, 1989
- Poecilochaetus japonicus Kitamori, 1965
- Poecilochaetus johnsoni Hartman, 1939
- Poecilochaetus koshikiensis Miura, 1988
- Poecilochaetus magnus Imajima, 1989
- Poecilochaetus martini Brantley, 2009
- Poecilochaetus modestus Rullier, 1965
- Poecilochaetus multibranchiatus Leon-Gonzalez, 1992
- Poecilochaetus paratropicus Gallardo, 1968
- Poecilochaetus perequensis Santos & Mackie, 2008
- Poecilochaetus polycirratus Santos & Mackie, 2008
- Poecilochaetus serpens Allen, 1904
- Poecilochaetus spinulosus Mackie, 1990
- Poecilochaetus tokyoensis Imajima, 1989
- Poecilochaetus trachyderma Read, 1986
- Poecilochaetus tricirratus Mackie, 1990
- Poecilochaetus trilobatus Imajima, 1989
- Poecilochaetus tropicus Okuda, 1937
- Poecilochaetus vietnamita Gallardo, 1968
- Poecilochaetus vitjazi Levenstein, 1962
