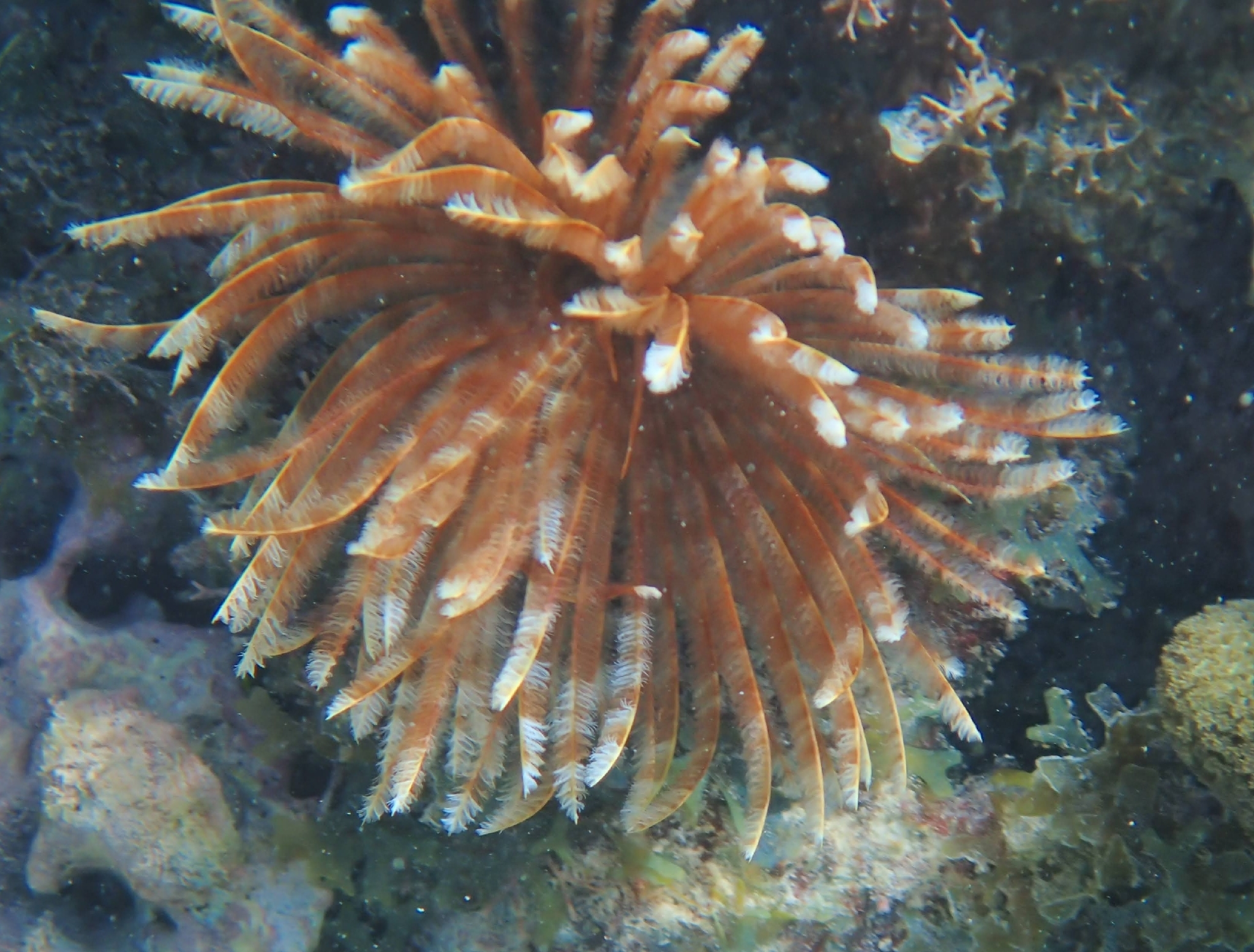

Scientific classification
- Kingdom: Animalia
- Phylum: Annelida
- Clade: Pleistoannelida
- Clade: Sedentaria
- Order: Sabellida
- Family: Sabellidae
- Genus: Sabellastarte
- Species: S. magnifica

Binomial name
- Sabellastarte magnifica (Shaw, 1800)

Synonyms
- Bispira melania (Schmarda, 1861) sensu Mullin, 1923; Sabella lingua Krøyer, 1856; Sabella melania Schmarda, 1861; Sabella splendida Kinberg, 1866; Tubularia magnifica Shaw, 1800

= Sabellastarte magnifica =

Species of annelid worm

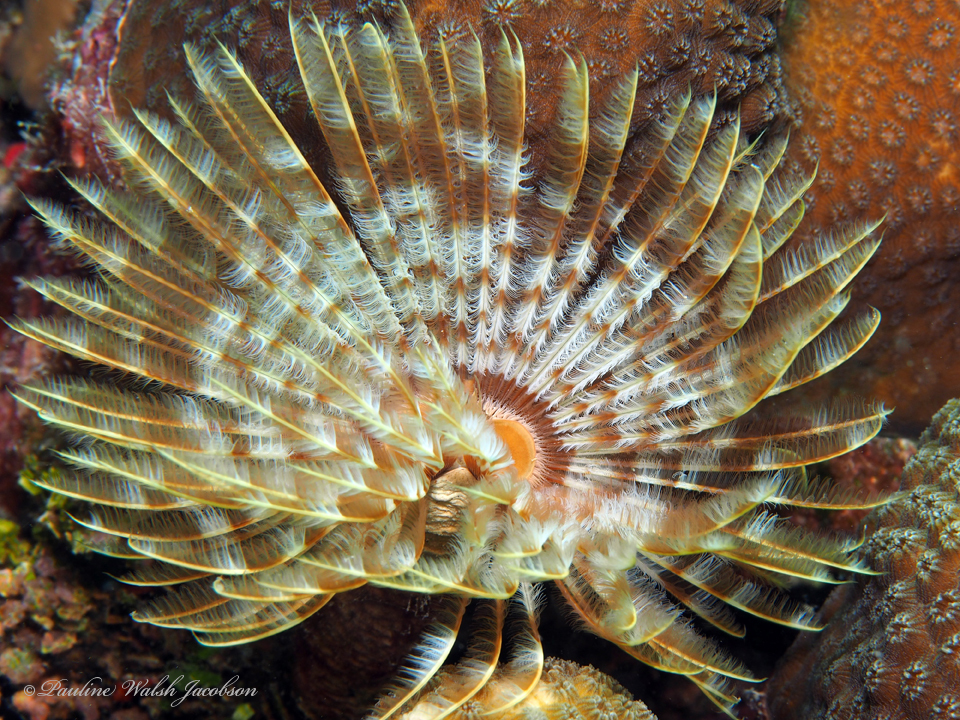
S. magnifica

Sabellastarte magnifica, the magnificent feather duster worm, is a species of marine polychaete worm in the Sabellidae family. It can be found among sandy reefs in the Caribbean. It may be included in aquariums because of its distinctive appearance and its ability to remove organic particles and improve water quality.

== Description ==
The magnificent feather duster worm can reach 10 centimetres (3.9 in) in length, with a crown as large as 15 centimetres (5.9 in) in diameter. It lives in a tough, leathery tube, and projects a crown of branched tentacles, or radioles, which form a plume. The radioles tend to be an orange-brown color with white tips.
