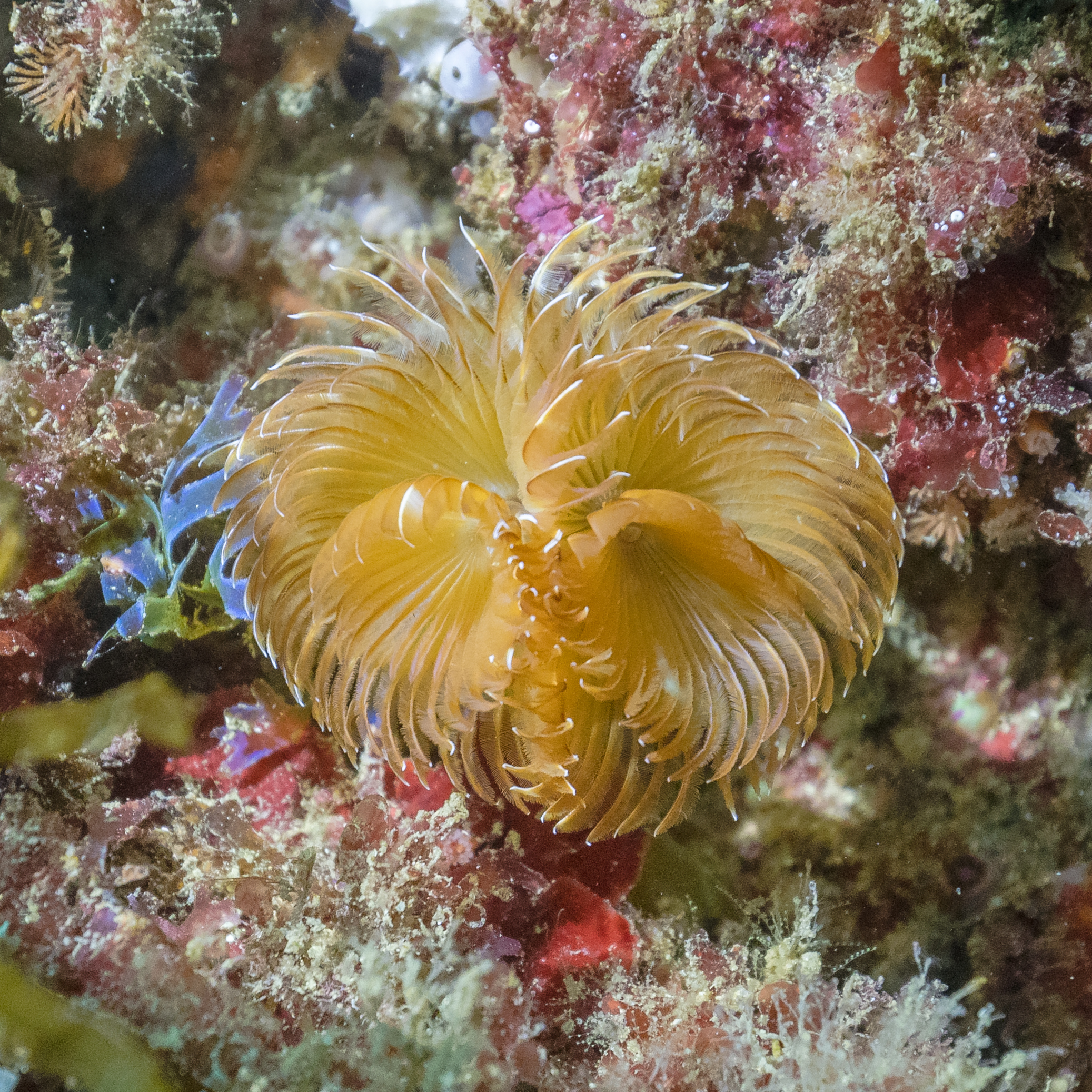
- Bispira volutacornis in Arrábida Natural Park, Portugal

Scientific classification
- Kingdom: Animalia
- Phylum: Annelida
- Clade: Pleistoannelida
- Clade: Sedentaria
- Order: Sabellida
- Family: Sabellidae
- Subfamily: Sabellinae
- Genus: Bispira
- Species: B. volutacornis

Binomial name
- Bispira volutacornis Montagu, 1804

Synonyms
- Amphitrite josephina (Risso, 1826); Amphitrite volutacornis (Montagu, 1804); Distylia punctata (Quatrefages, 1866); Distylia volutacornis (Montagu, 1804); Sabella bispiralis (Cuvier, 1829); Sabella volutacornis (Montagu, 1804)

= Bispira volutacornis =

Species of annelid worm

Bispira volutacornis, sometimes known as the twin fan worm or spiral fan worm, is a species of tube worm inhabiting the shallow sublittoral zone of the eastern Atlantic Ocean. It has a parchment-like tube with a mucoid outer layer, often coated with mud or silt. The tube is usually concealed in a crevice, and the worm can retract into it when disturbed.

== Description ==
Bispira volutacornis often grows in colonies. Each individual worm has a double-headed crown formed from several whorls comprising up to 200 feathery plumes. One or more pairs of composite eyes are present on the outer side of the crown. The worm secretes a soft, parchment-like tube, about 1 cm (0.4 in) in diameter, from which it protrudes and into which it can retract when disturbed. The outside of the tube is often covered with mud or silt. When the crown is retracted, the top of the tube becomes pinched together, forming a figure-of-eight shape. The worm's body is greenish or brownish and up to 10 cm (4 in) long, and the crown colour is variable and often banded, ranging from white to tan to reddish-brown. The fully expanded crown is about 4 cm (1.6 in) in diameter.

== Distribution and habitat ==
Bispira volutacornis is found in the eastern North Atlantic Ocean, including the North Sea, the English Channel, and the Mediterranean Sea. It occurs in deep tide pools and in the shallow sublittoral zone, at depths down to about 40 m (130 ft). It grows in crevices and stony areas, preferring locations rich in sediment but with low levels of illumination.

== Ecology ==
Bispira volutacornis feeds on plankton, which it captures with its plumes. It also uses the plumes to gather sediment with which to expand the tube. Each individual is either male or female, and the gametes are released into the water column, where fertilisation occurs. The worm is sometimes parasitised by Gastrodelphis clausii, a small copepod; one or several of these copepods move among the crown of plumes and appear to be obligate parasites of Bispira volutacornis.
