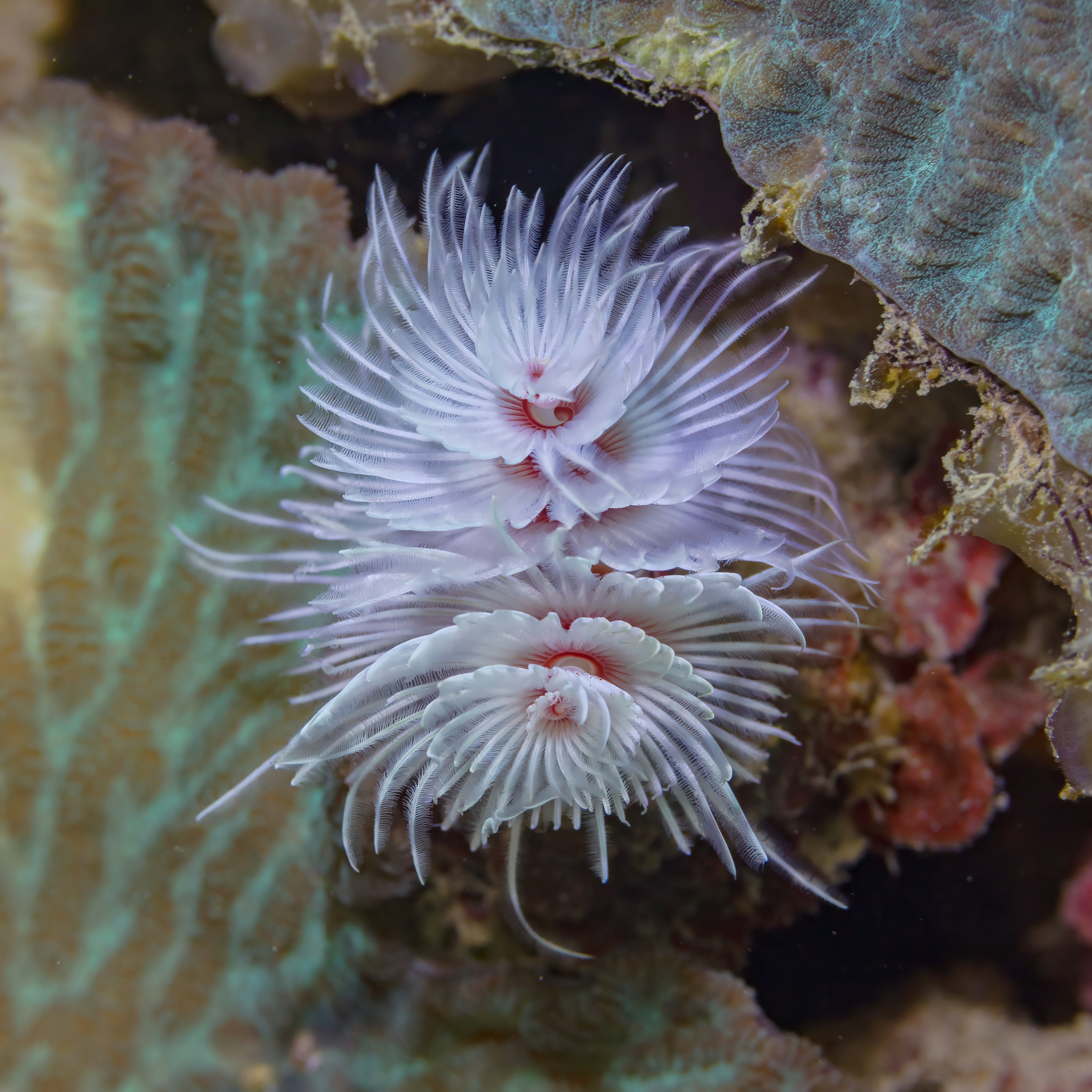

Scientific classification
- Kingdom: Animalia
- Phylum: Annelida
- Clade: Pleistoannelida
- Clade: Sedentaria
- Order: Sabellida
- Family: Sabellidae
- Genus: Sabellastarte
- Species: S. spectabilis

Binomial name
- Sabellastarte spectabilis (Grube, 1878)

Synonyms
- Sabella indica Savigny, 1822; Sabella spectabilis Grube, 1878; Sabellastarte indica (Savigny, 1822)

= Sabellastarte spectabilis =

Species of annelid worm

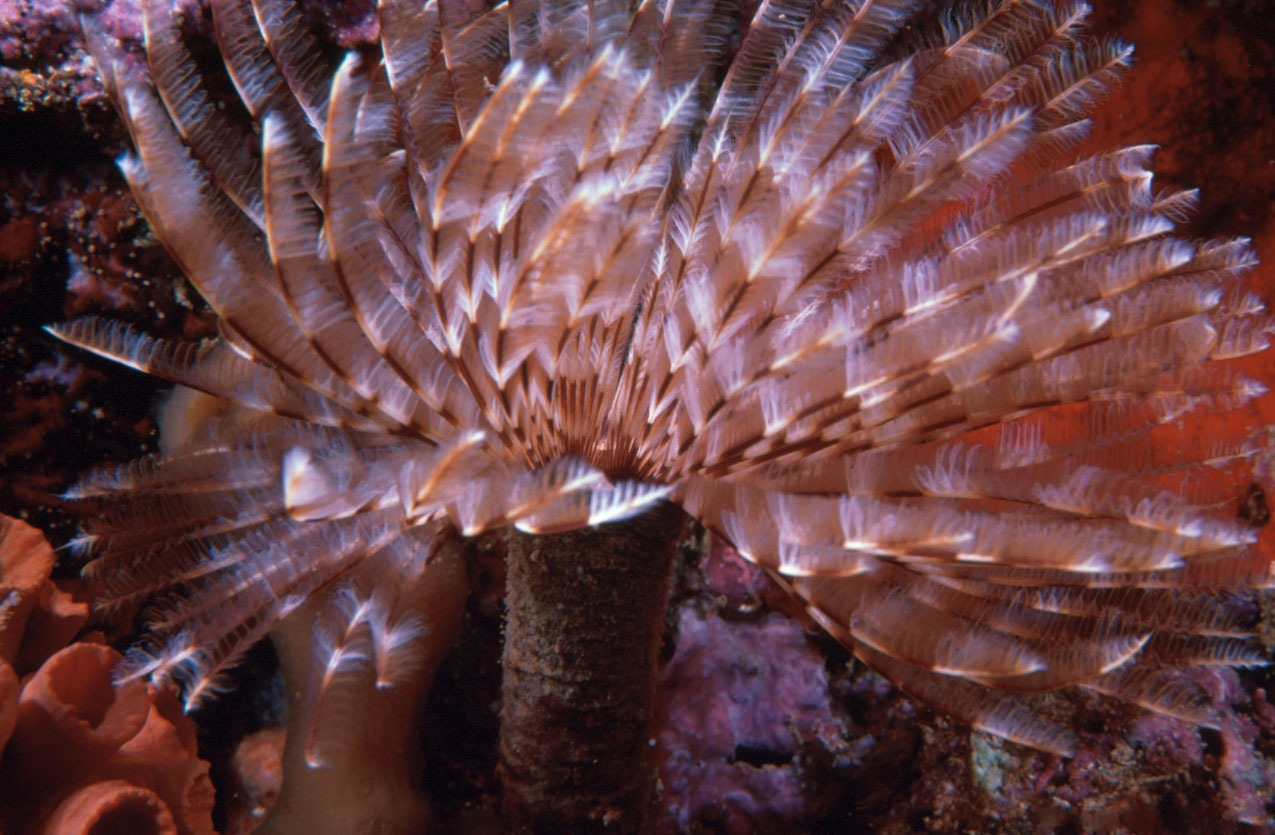
S. spectabilis

Sabellastarte spectabilis is a species of benthic marine polychaete worm in the Sabellidae family. It is commonly known as the feather duster worm, feather duster or fan worm. It is native to tropical waters of the Indo-Pacific but has spread to other parts of the world. It is popular in aquariums because of its distinctive appearance and its ability to remove organic particles and improve water quality.

Polychaetes, or marine bristle worms, have elongated bodies divided into many segments. Each segment may bear setae (bristles) and parapodia (paddle-like appendages). Some species live freely, either swimming, crawling or burrowing, and these are known as "errant". Others live permanently in tubes, either calcareous or parchment-like, and these are known as "sedentary".

== Taxonomy ==
This worm has a complex taxonomic history. It was known as Sabellastarte sanctijosephi when it first appeared in Hawaii in the 20th century. The names S. punctata and S. indica were used by Hartman (1966) and others. In 2003 Knight-Jones and Mackie undertook a revision of the genus Sabellastarte and determined that Sabellastarte spectabilis was the correct name.

== Description ==
This large worm can reach 80 millimetres (3.1 in) in length and 10–12 millimetres (0.39–0.47 in) in width. It is buff in colour with purple specks. It lives in a tough, leathery tube covered with fine mud. Projecting from this is a branchial crown of branched tentacles, the radioles, which form a plume. The tentacles are striped in dark and pale brown bands and bear neither stylodes nor eye spots. There are two long, slender palps and a four-lobed collar.

== Distribution ==
The native range of S. spectabilis is the Indian Ocean and the Red Sea, but it is now also found on the coasts of Africa and Mozambique and the Gulf of Mexico. In 2002 it was reported on pilings, floating docks and harbour walls in Hawaii.

== Habitat ==
S. spectabilis is found in holes and cracks and among algae on reefs and rocky shores. It is sometimes found growing in crevices in the coral Pocillopora meandrina, under boulders in still water, in holes in lava, in tidal pools and in channels exposed to heavy surf.

== Biology ==
Fanworms in Malta

S. spectabilis is a filter feeder. Cilia on the tentacles cause currents in the water and organic particles are caught as they float past. They are channelled along mucus-filled grooves to the mouth. Larger non-food particles are used for building the tube. The tentacles are also used as gills for gas exchange.

This worm can reproduce asexually by fragmentation, and can regenerate body parts after being damaged. Reproduction can also be by sexual means. Most worms are either male or female and the gametes mature in the coelom before being released into the water column. Some specimens, particularly larger ones, have both male and female gametes and a study concluded that this was consistent with sequential hermaphroditism. Fertilization is external, and after a short time in the plankton, the trochophore larvae settle out and grow into adult worms.
