= Edgar Johnson Allen =

British marine biologist

Allen in 1930

Edgar Johnson Allen CBE FRS (6 April 1866 – 7 December 1942) was a British marine biologist. He was elected a Fellow of the Royal Society in 1914 and won the Gold Medal of the Linnean Society in 1926 and the Royal Society's Darwin Medal in 1936.

Allen was the fifth Director of the Marine Biological Association of the United Kingdom in Plymouth, serving from 1894 to 1936. The citation for his Darwin Medal reads In recognition of his long continued work for the advancement of marine biology, not only by his own researches but by the great influence he has exerted on very numerous investigations at Plymouth.
