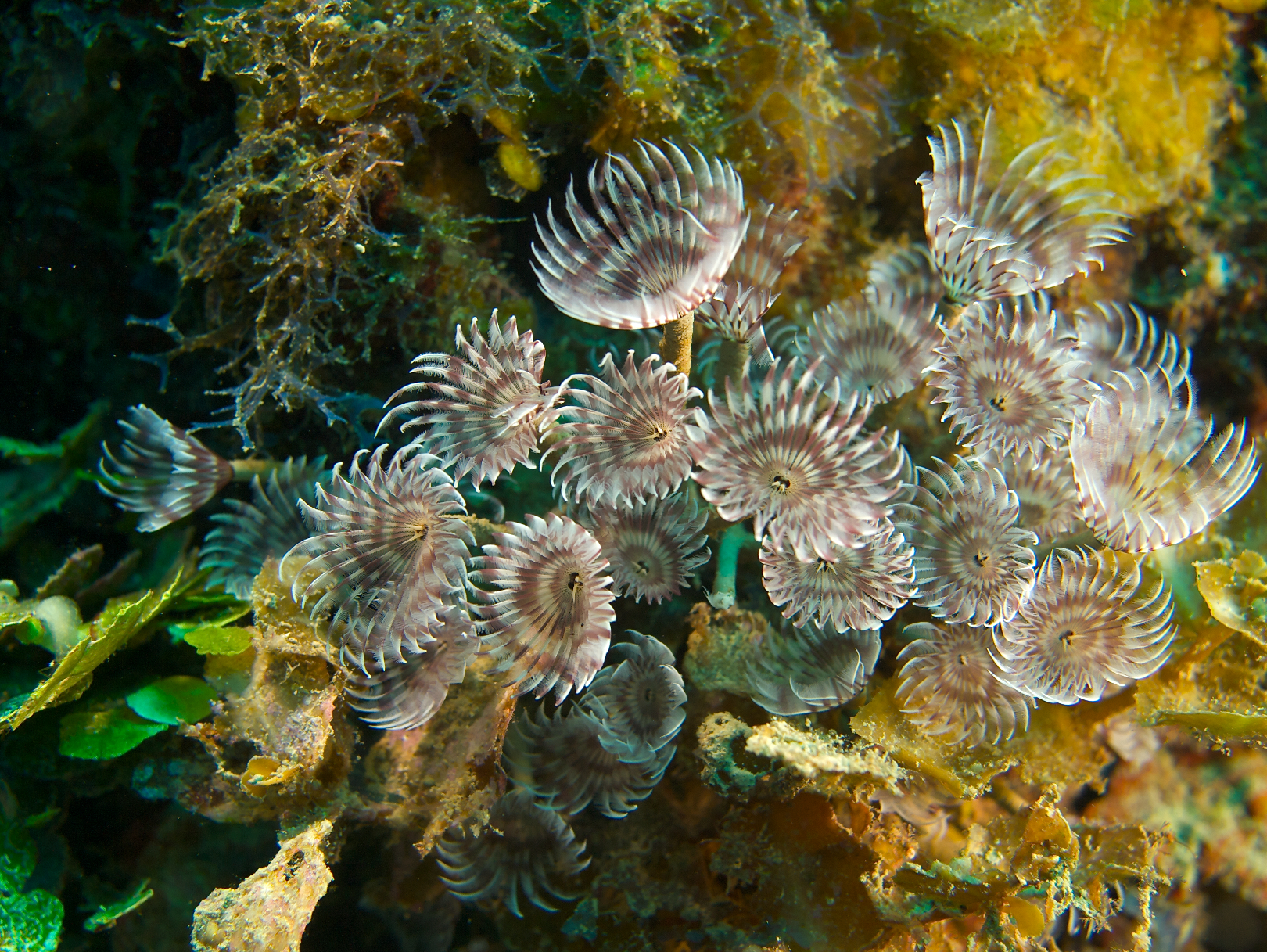
- Bispira brunnea, the social feather duster worm

Scientific classification
- Kingdom: Animalia
- Phylum: Annelida
- Clade: Pleistoannelida
- Clade: Sedentaria
- Order: Sabellida
- Family: Sabellidae
- Subfamily: Sabellinae
- Genus: Bispira; Krøyer, 1856

Species
- See text

= Bispira =

Genus of annelids

Bispira is a genus of marine bristleworm in the family Sabellidae. Its members were initially included in genus Sabella by Grube in 1851. In 1856, Krøyer described Bispira as a separate genus. Members of Bispira are defined by spirally-coiled, equally-divided branchial lobes.

== Species ==
According to the World Register of Marine Species, Bispira contains 31 valid species:

- Bispira brunnea (Treadwell, 1917)
- Bispira crassicornis (Sars, 1851)
- Bispira elegans (Bush, 1905)
- Bispira fabricii (Krøyer, 1856)
- Bispira guinensis (Augener, 1918)
- Bispira klautae Costa-Paiva & Paiva, 2007
- Bispira manicata (Grube, 1878)
- Bispira mariae Lo Bianco, 1893
- Bispira melanostigma (Schmarda, 1861)
- Bispira monroi (Hartman, 1961)
- Bispira oatesiana (Benham, 1927)
- Bispira pacifica (Berkeley & Berkeley, 1954)
- Bispira paraporifera Tovar-Hernandez & Salazar-Vallejo, 2006
- Bispira polyomma Giangrande & Faasse, 2012
- Bispira porifera (Grube, 1878)
- Bispira primaoculata Cepeda & Lattig, 2017
- Bispira secusolutus (Hoagland, 1920)
- Bispira serrata Capa, 2007
- Bispira spirobranchia (Zachs, 1933)
- Bispira tricyclia (Schmarda, 1861)
- Bispira turneri Hartman, 1969
- Bispira viola (Grube, 1863)
- Bispira volutacornis (Montagu, 1804)
- Bispira wireni (Johansson, 1922)
