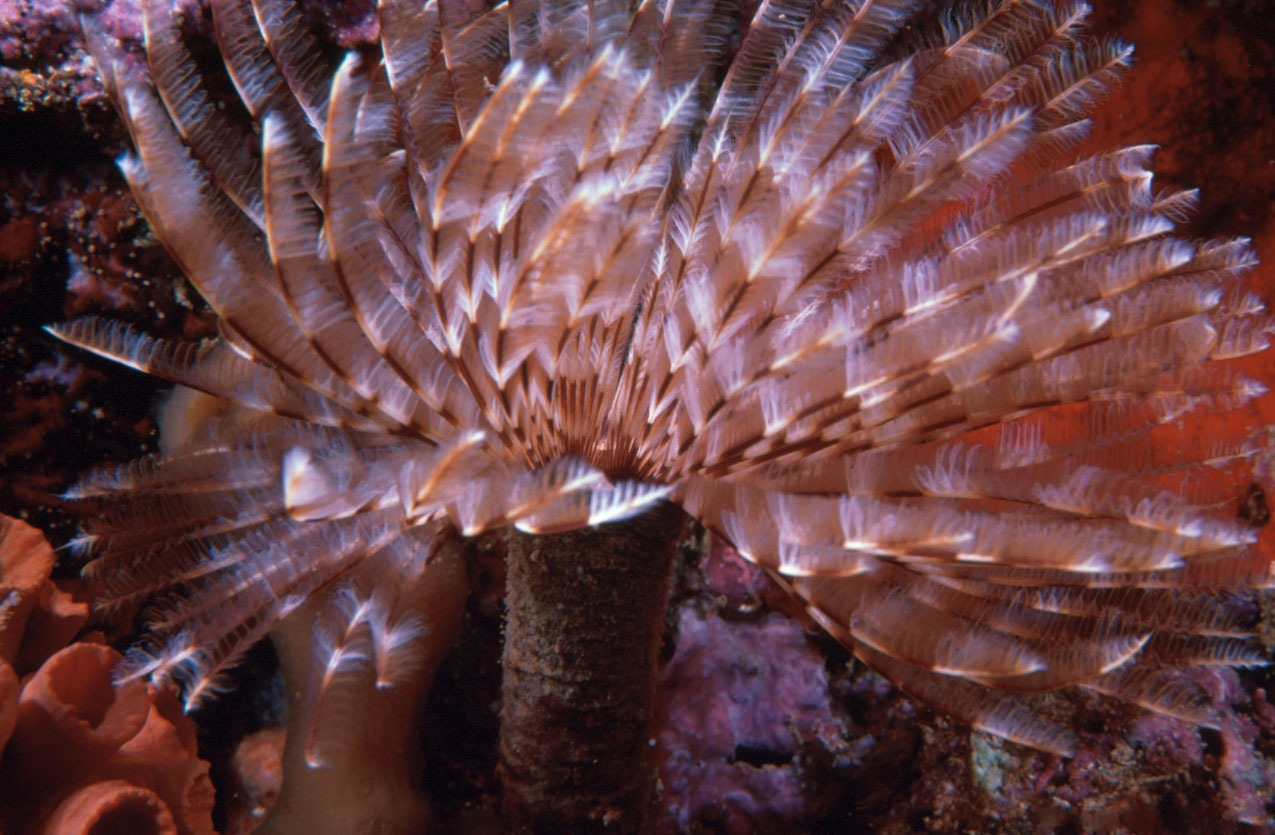
- Sabellastarte spectabilis

Scientific classification
- Kingdom: Animalia
- Phylum: Annelida
- Clade: Pleistoannelida
- Clade: Sedentaria
- Order: Sabellida
- Family: Sabellidae
- Subfamily: Sabellinae
- Genus: Sabellastarte; Krøyer, 1856

= Sabellastarte =

Genus of annelid worms

Sabellastarte is a genus of marine polychaete worms in the family Sabellidae.

== Species ==
The following species are classified in this genus:

- Sabellastarte australiensis (Haswell, 1884)
- Sabellastarte fallax (Quatrefages, 1866)
- Sabellastarte japonica (Marenzeller, 1884)
- Sabellastarte magnifica (Shaw, 1800)
- Sabellastarte pectoralis (Quatrefages, 1866)
- Sabellastarte samoensis (Grube, 1870)
- Sabellastarte sanctijosephi (Gravier, 1906)
- Sabellastarte spectabilis (Grube, 1878)
