= Sabellastarte sanctijosephi =

Scientific classification
- Kingdom: Animalia
- Phylum: Annelida
- Clade: Pleistoannelida
- Clade: Sedentaria
- Order: Sabellida
- Family: Sabellidae
- Genus: Sabellastarte
- Species: S. sanctijosephi

Binomial name
- Sabellastarte sanctijosephi (Gravier, 1906)

Synonyms
- Eurato sanctjosephi Gravier, 1906

Species of annelid worm

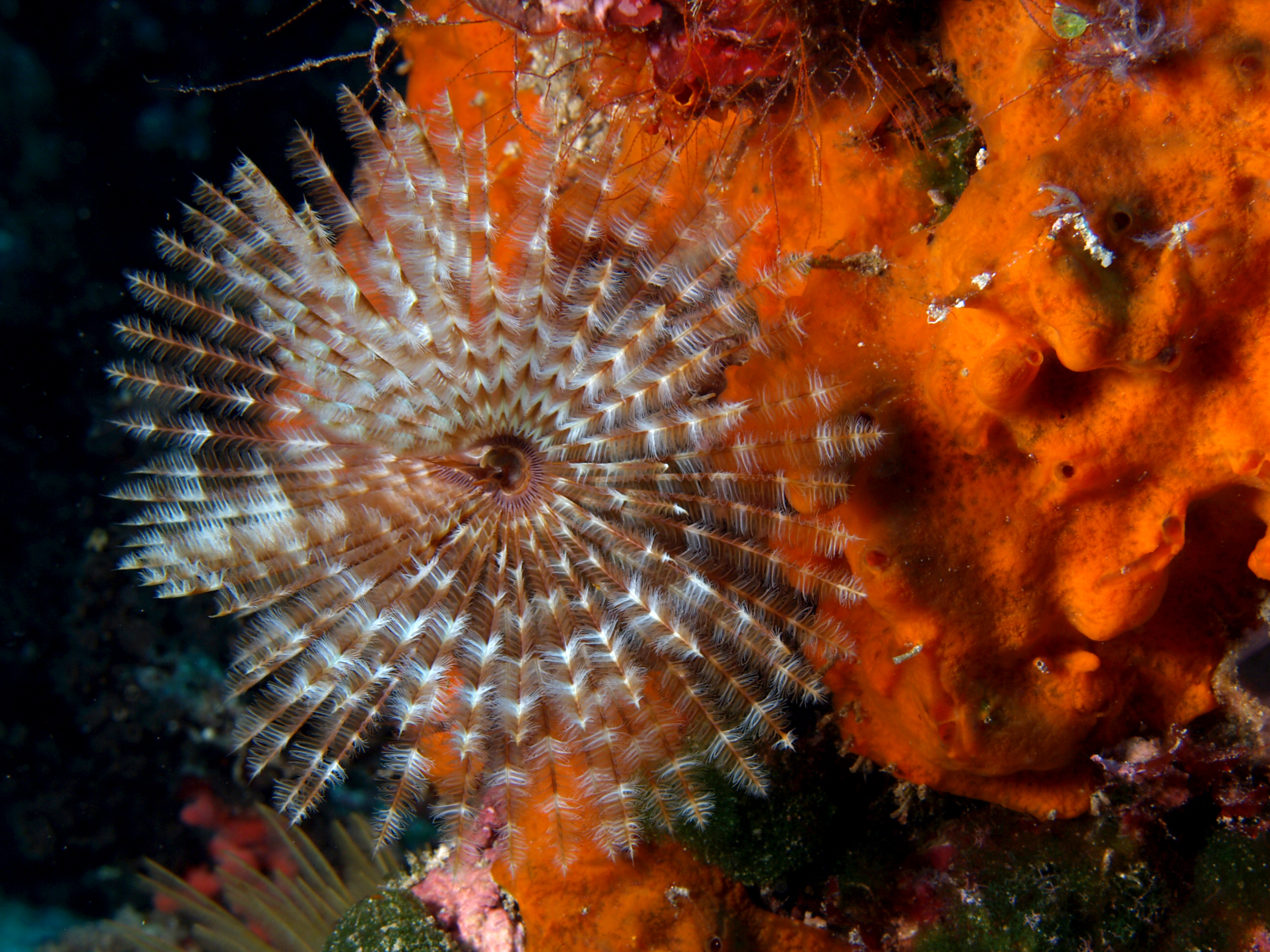

Sabellastarte sanctjosephi is a species of benthic marine polychaete worm in the family Sabellidae.

== Distribution ==
Sabellastarte sanctjosephi is endemic to the Red Sea and coastal waters off the coast of East Africa.
