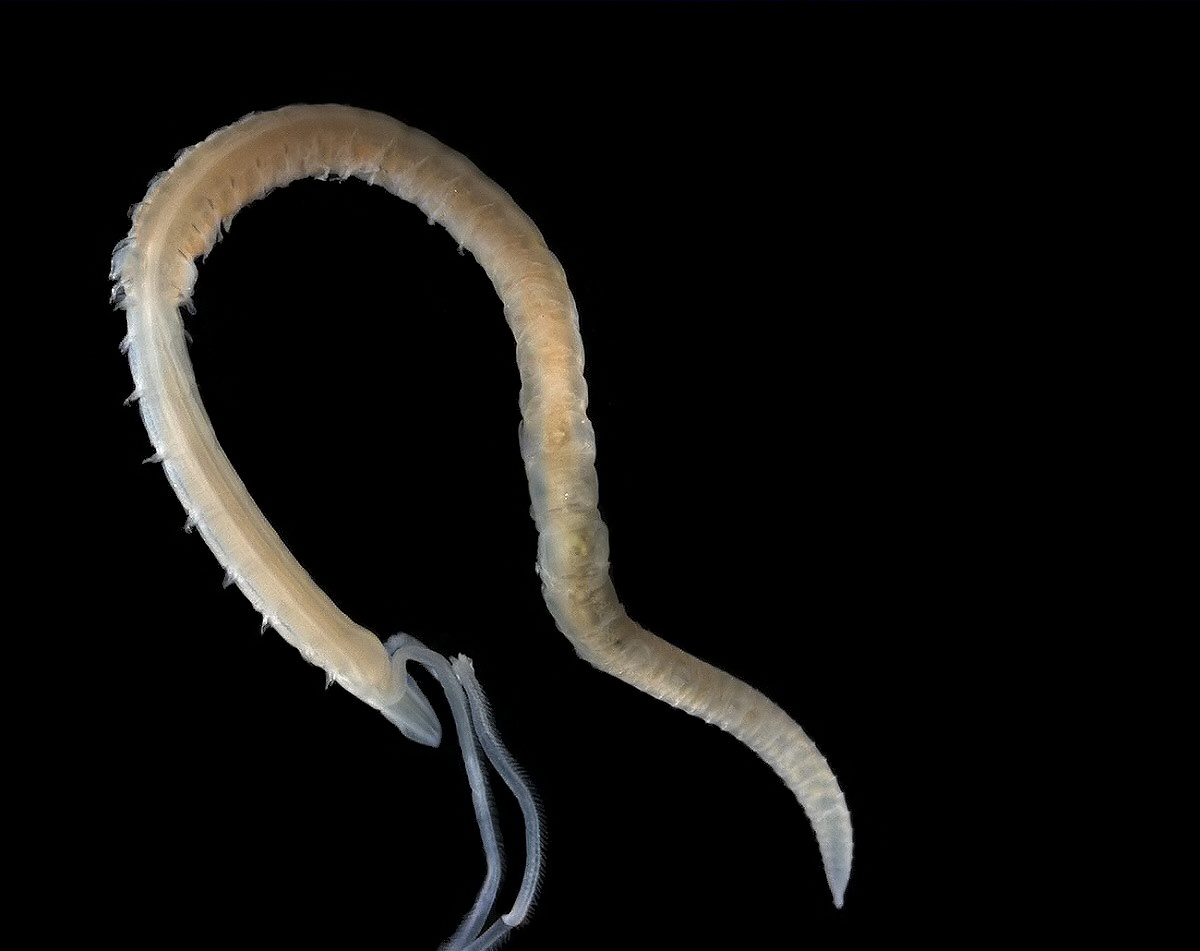
- Magelona johnstoni with long feeding palps.

Scientific classification
- Domain: Eukaryota
- Kingdom: Animalia
- Phylum: Annelida
- Clade: Pleistoannelida
- Clade: Sedentaria
- Infraclass: Canalipalpata
- Order: Spionida

Families
- Several, see text

= Spionida =

Order of annelid worms

Spionida is an order of marine polychaete worms in the infraclass Canalipalpata. Spionids are cosmopolitan and live in soft substrates in the littoral or neritic zones.

== Characteristics ==
Spionids have a single pair of flexible feeding tentacles with grooves, arising directly from the prostomium. The mouth has no jaws and the pharynx is partly eversible. Some species have small eye spots and some a central sensory lobe. Some of the anterior segments paired gills. The parapodia or lateral lobes have large lamellae. The chaetae are unbranched capillaries, spines and hooks.

== Families ==
According to the World Register of Marine Species (WoRMS), the Spionida comprises six families in a single suborder:

- Order Spionida
  - Suborder Spioniformia
    - Apistobranchidae Mesnil and Caullery, 1898
    - Longosomatidae Hartman, 1944
    - Magelonidae Cunningham and Ramage 1888
    - Poecilochaetidae Hannerz, 1956
    - Spionidae Grube, 1850
    - Trochochaetidae Pettibone, 1963
    - Uncispionidae Green, 1982

Other families such as Aberrantidae and Magelonidae are sometimes included in Spionida.
