= Trochochaetidae =

Scientific classification
- Domain: Eukaryota
- Kingdom: Animalia
- Phylum: Annelida
- Clade: Pleistoannelida
- Clade: Sedentaria
- Order: Spionida
- Family: Trochochaetidae

Family of annelid worms

Trochochaetidae is a family of polychaetes belonging to the order Spionida.

Genera:

- Cherusca Müller, 1858
- Nevaya McIntosh, 1911
- Trochochaeta Levinsen, 1884
