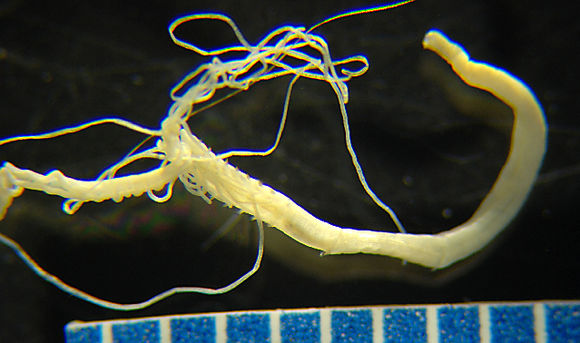

Scientific classification
- Domain: Eukaryota
- Kingdom: Animalia
- Phylum: Annelida
- Clade: Pleistoannelida
- Clade: Sedentaria
- Order: Spionida
- Family: Longosomatidae

= Longosomatidae =

Family of annelid worms

Longosomatidae is a family of polychaetes belonging to the order Spionida.

Genera:

- Heterospio Ehlers, 1874
