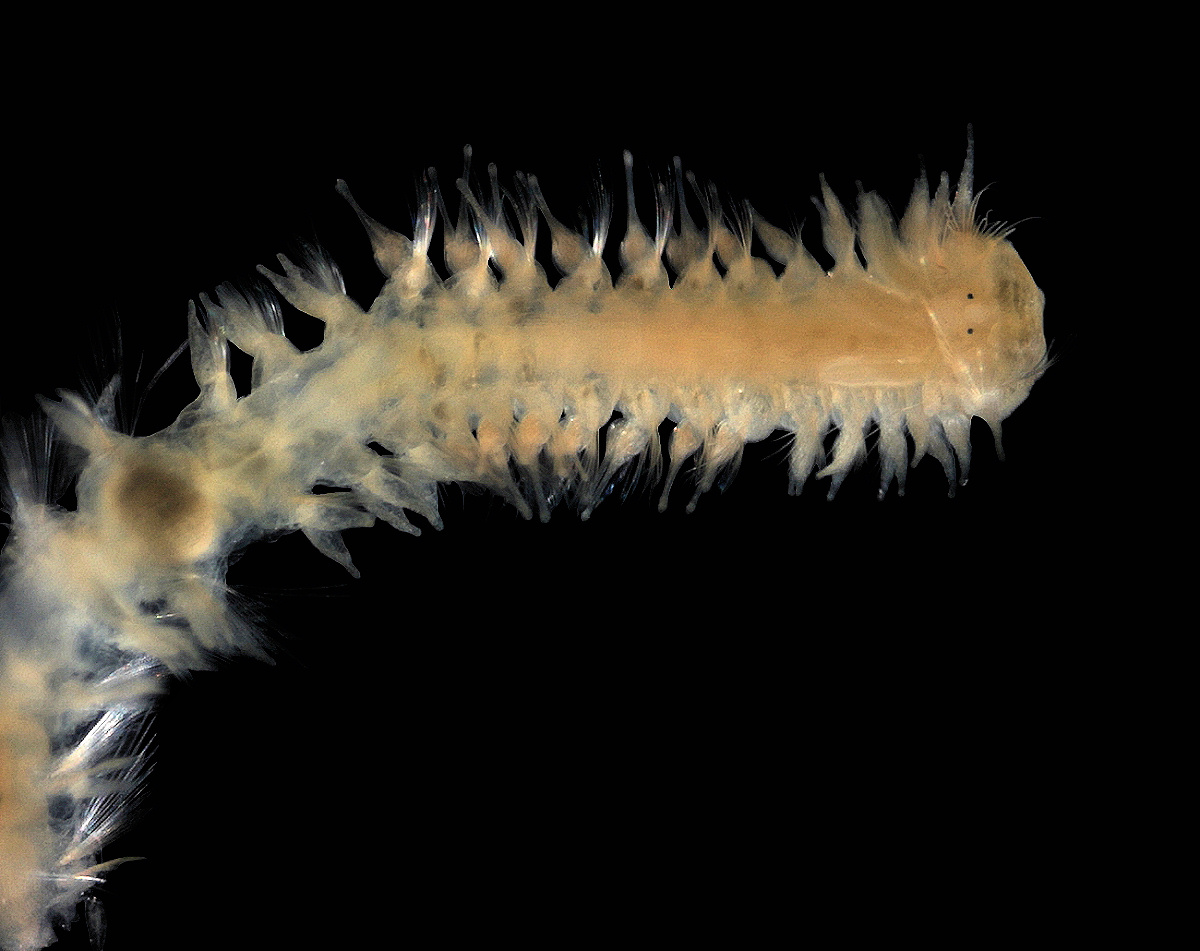
- Poecilochaetus serpens

Scientific classification
- Domain: Eukaryota
- Kingdom: Animalia
- Phylum: Annelida
- Clade: Pleistoannelida
- Clade: Sedentaria
- Order: Spionida
- Family: Poecilochaetidae; Hannerz, 1956

Genera
- Poecilochaetus Claparède in Ehlers, 1875

= Poecilochaetidae =

Family of annelids

Poecilochaetidae is a family of marine worms within the Polychaeta. It is a monotypic family containing the single genus Poecilochaetus. Members of this family are benthic worms that burrow into soft sediments.
