= Uncispionidae =

Scientific classification
- Domain: Eukaryota
- Kingdom: Animalia
- Phylum: Annelida
- Clade: Pleistoannelida
- Clade: Sedentaria
- Order: Spionida
- Family: Uncispionidae

Family of annelid worms

Uncispionidae is a family of polychaetes belonging to the order Spionida.

Genera:

- Rhamphispio Blake & Maciolek, 2018
- Uncispio Green, 1982
- Uncopherusa Fauchald & Hancock, 1984
