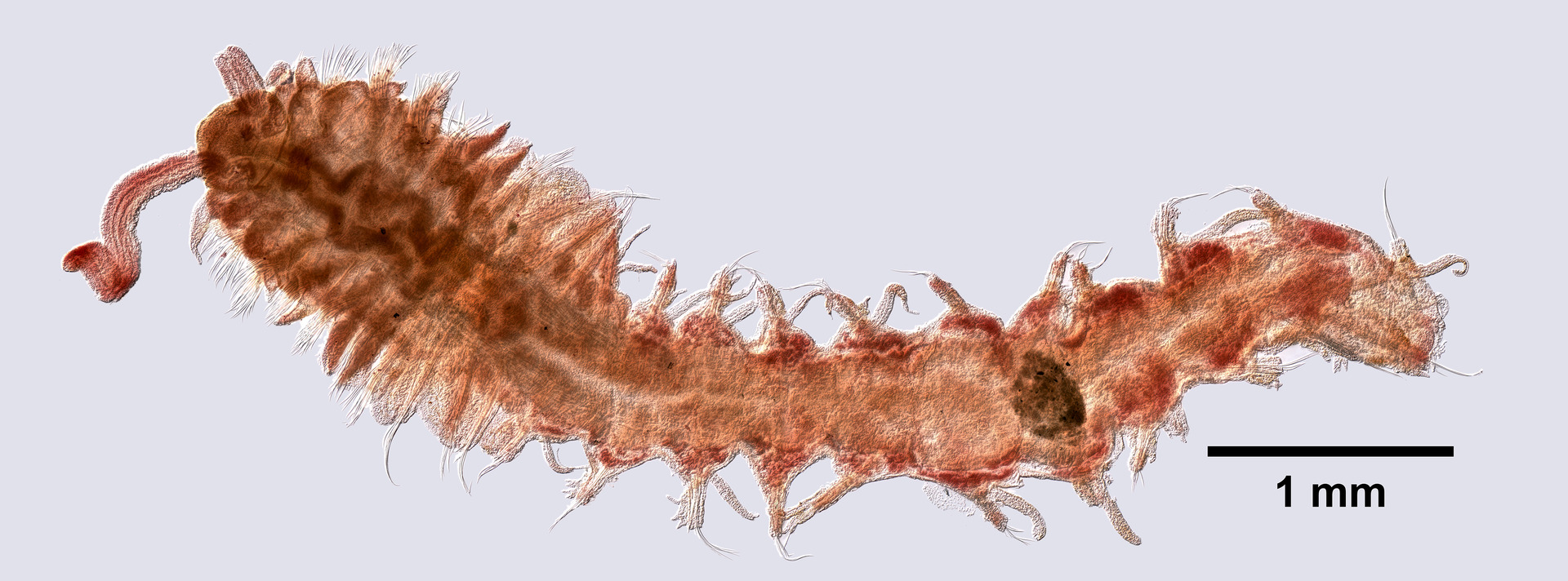
- Apistobranchus tullbergi

Scientific classification
- Kingdom: Animalia
- Phylum: Annelida
- Family: Apistobranchidae; Mesnil & Caullery, 1898

Genera
- Apistobranchus Levinsen, 1884; Ethocles Webster & Benedict, 1887; Skardaria Wesenberg-Lund, 1951

= Apistobranchidae =

Family of polychaetes

Apistobranchidae is a family of chaetopteriform annelids.
