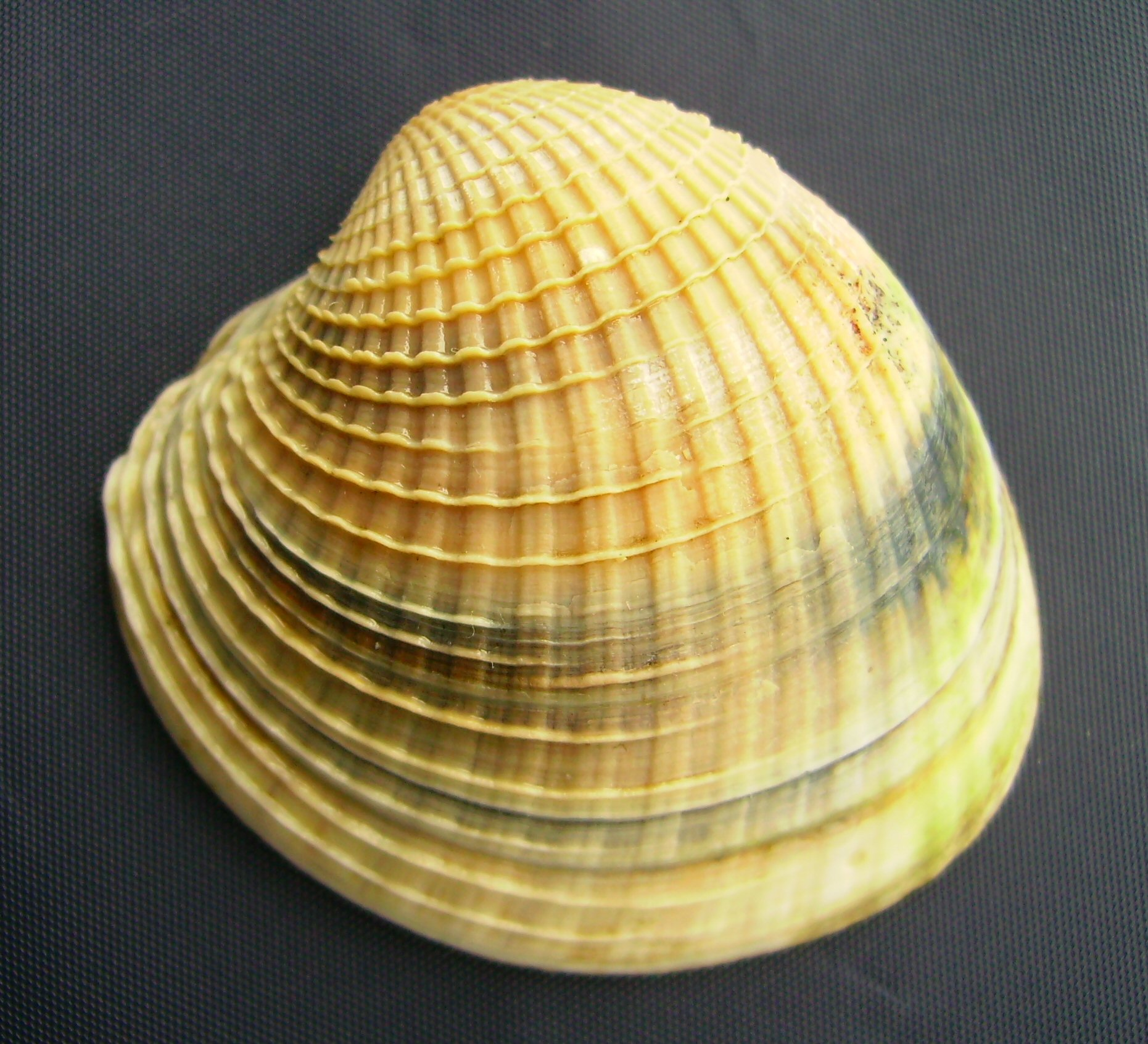
- View of A. stutchburyi shell outer surface
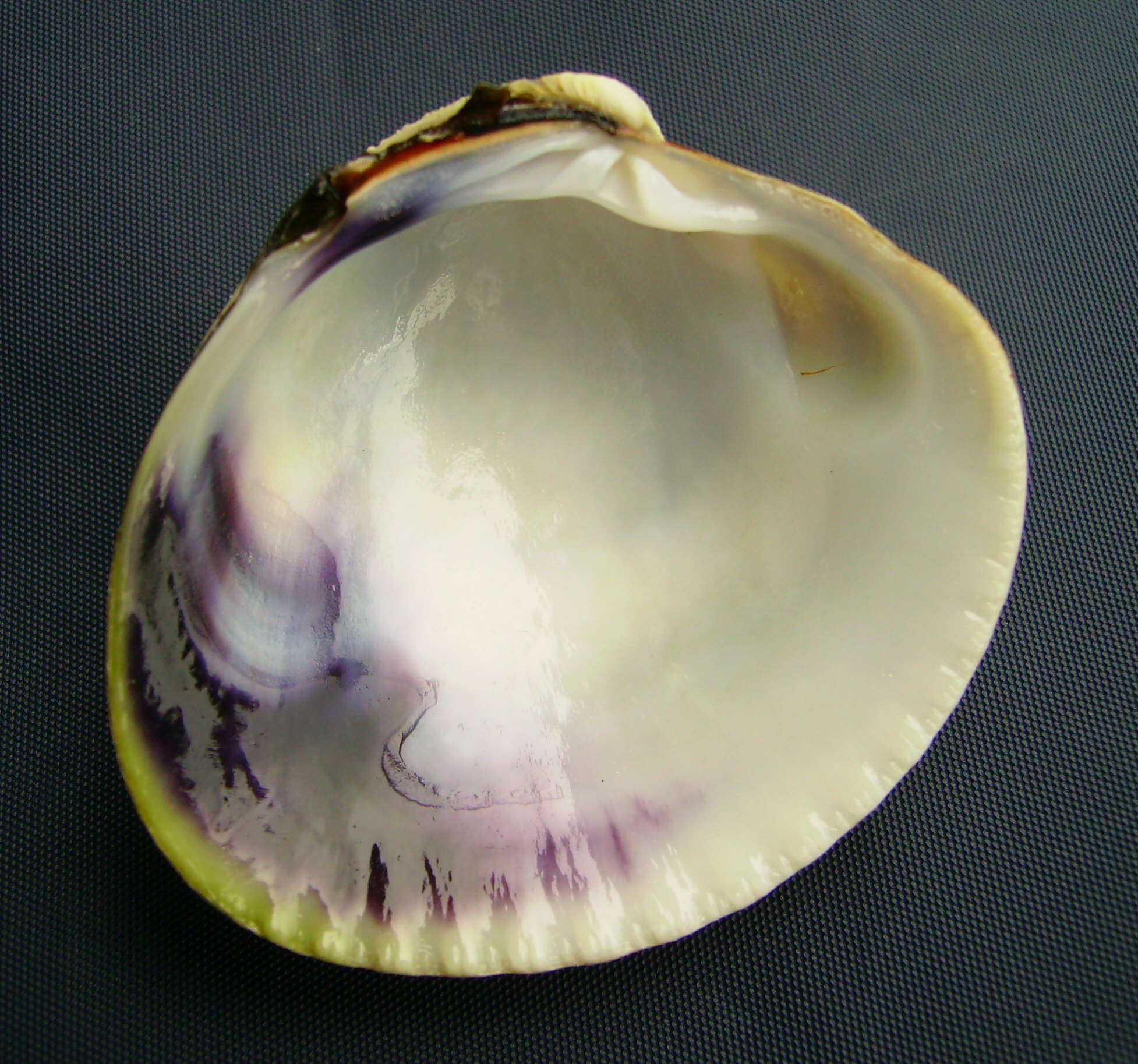
- View of A. stutchburyi shell inner surface

Conservation status
- Not evaluated (IUCN 3.1)

Scientific classification
- Kingdom: Animalia
- Phylum: Mollusca
- Class: Bivalvia
- Order: Venerida
- Family: Veneridae
- Genus: Austrovenus
- Species: A. stutchburyi

Binomial name
- Austrovenus stutchburyi (Wood, 1828)

Synonyms
- List: Austrovenus crassitesta (Finlay, 1924); Austrovenus stutchburyi f. crassitesta (Finlay, 1924); Chione aucklandica Powell, 1932; Chione crassitesta Finlay, 1924; Chione stutchburyi (Wood, 1828); Venericardia zelandica Potiez & Michaud, 1844; Venus (Chione) macleayana Tenison Woods, 1879; Venus dieffenbachii Gray, 1843; Venus macleayana Tenison Woods, 1879; Venus stutchburii Wood, 1828; Venus stutchburyi Wood, 1828; Venus zelandica Quoy & Gaimard, 1835

= Austrovenus stutchburyi =

Austrovenus stutchburyi Temporal range: Early Pliocene – Recent 5.33–0 Ma

Species of bivalve

Austrovenus stutchburyi, commonly known as the New Zealand cockle or New Zealand little neck clam, is a marine bivalve in the family Veneridae that occurs only in New Zealand. Its Māori name is tuangi in the North Island or tuaki in the South Island. The shell is between 15 to 65 mm (0.59 to 2.56 in) in length, but may reach up to 90 mm (3.5 in). The outside is dirty white; the inside is porcelain white and often has purple stains. A. stutchburyi is widespread throughout the coasts of New Zealand, including the Chatham Islands and subantarctic Auckland Islands. It is found in the intertidal-to-low-tide zone in muddy and fine sands. A. stutchburyi feeds via suspension feeding, where food particles are filtered out of the water. The species is often harvested for food, active commercial harvesting occurring in the Dunedin and Tasman regions. It is a traditional food source for Māori people, who have an archaeological history of harvesting A. stutchburyi and have customary fishing rights to harvest it in areas of cultural significance.

Spawning occurs in spring and summer; the larvae (juvenile stage) attach to a surface within twenty days. The rate at which A. stutchburyi grows depends heavily on environmental conditions such as salinity, food availability and temperature. A. stutchburyi may support primary production (the conversion of inorganic carbon to organic compounds) by releasing ammonium ions within ecosystems. Its predators include crabs, wading birds, large whelks (carnivorous shellfish) and stingrays. The clam is known to be infected by the larvae of the trematodes Curtuteria australis and Acanthoparyphium, which damage the ability of A. stutchburyi to burrow into sediment. A. stutchburyi can cause neurotoxic shellfish poisoning after exposure to red tides, which release toxins into the water that are subsequently absorbed by the clams.

Many populations of A. stutchburyi have been depleted by overharvesting or human-mediated changes to their habitat. Excessive amounts of sediment can also threaten the clam by smothering it. As such, there have been efforts to restore depleted populations by transplanting individuals from healthy ecosystems. The customary Māori principles of taiāpure, mātaitai reserves and rāhui, a series of resource-management practices incorporated into New Zealand law can be used to regulate the species' harvesting. Since A. stutchburyi accumulates heavy metals and other contaminants, it has been considered a potential bioindicator.

== Taxonomy ==
Austrovenus stutchburyi is commonly referred to as New Zealand cockle or New Zealand little neck clam. In the indigenous Māori language, it can be referred to as tuangi in the North Island or tuaki in the South Island, among other names. It was first described using the modern system of nomenclature as Venus stutchburii by English zoologist William Wood. The specific name refers to Samuel Stutchbury, who collected the species from the Bay of Islands in 1826. Since that 1828 description, it has been mistakenly recognised as a new species several times. It was transferred to the genus Chione in 1906, then briefly to the genus Austrovenus in 1926 before being transferred back to Chione in 1927. It was finally placed in Austrovenus again in 1977. The lectotype (a single specimen designated as the type specimen when none was specified) is stored in the Natural History Museum of London.

It is the only living species in Austrovenus; the two other species (Austrovenus northlandica and Austrovenus tamakiensis) are only known from fossils. In the New Zealand fossil record, A. stutchburyi is common in Cenozoic Era deposits. The earliest fossil record of the species is from the Opoitian stage 5.33 ma (million years ago) in the early Pliocene. Most fossil records fall between the Mangapanian stage, which began roughly 3 ma, and early Haweran Stage (beginning 0.34 ma).

== Description ==
The A. stutchburyi shell has two valves, essentially two halves of a single shell, joined by an elastic material (the ligament), as is typical for bivalves. The hinge line, where the two valves meet, is rather wide. Each valve is 15 to 65 mm (0.59 to 2.56 in) long, but can occasionally exceed 90 mm (3.5 in). The shell's overall size can vary slightly throughout New Zealand, being slightly larger in the southern parts of the country. The shell's outer surface has a dirty white colour, at times with rust-coloured stains. The shell's interior is porcelain white and frequently stained purple towards one end of the shell. Occasionally, most of the interior is purple. The shell's interior presents circular scars impressed into the surface where the adductor muscles (which close the shell) attach to it. The outer surface has distinctive ribs running down and across the shell; those running down the shell become less prevalent towards the margin.

After veliger larvae settle on substrate, they are at least 180 μm in length. The hinge joining the two larval shells has a projection on the right shell that opposes two projections on the left. There are also ridges on the margins of the left shell that slot into the right shell. Overall, the veliger larvae have an appearance typical of Veneridae larvae.

== Distribution and habitat ==
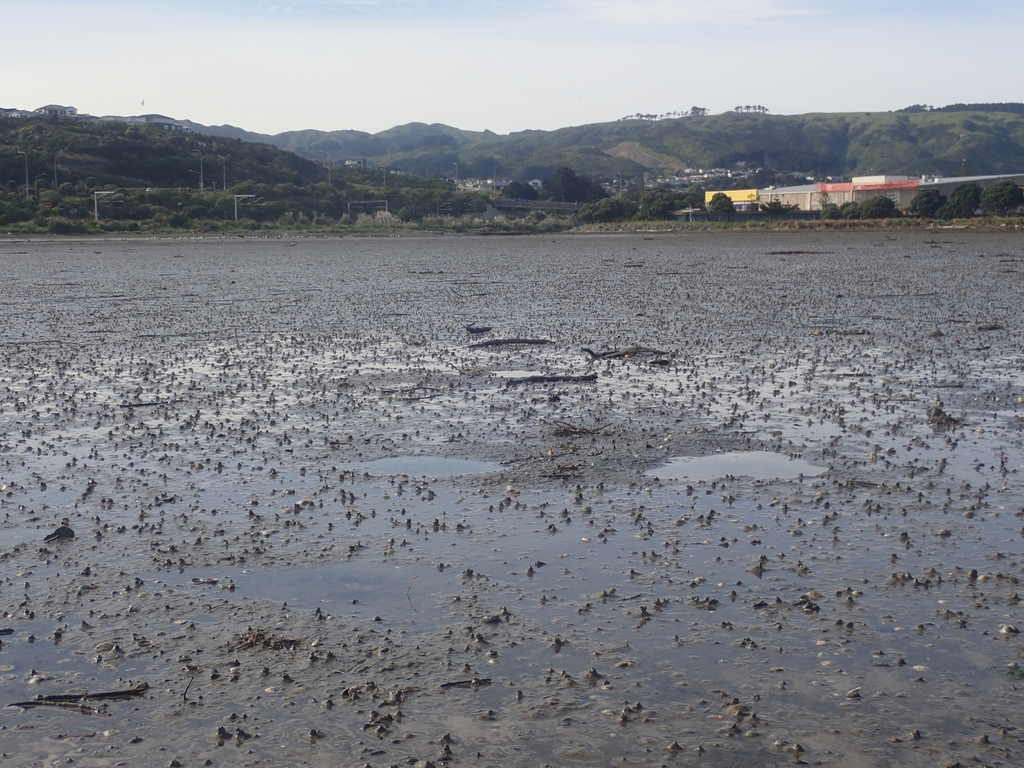
A mudflat in Porirua Harbour at low tide. This is the typical habitat of A. stutchburyi.

A. stutchburyi is endemic to (only found in) New Zealand and occurs throughout the two mainland islands, as well as Stewart Island (just south of the South Island), the Chatham Islands 800 km (500 mi) east of the mainland and the subantarctic Auckland Islands 465 km (289 mi) south of the mainland. It lives along the shoreline in sheltered areas with muddy sediment and fine sands, such as in estuaries and harbours. It typically occurs from upper mid-intertidal zones to just below the lowest tide level reached during spring tides. In these habitats, A. stutchburyi can be extremely abundant with population density varying between sites. At Akaroa Harbour in Canterbury, the species was estimated to have a population density of 1,200 per m^{2} at one study site and 500 per m^{2} at another nearby study site. A. stutchburyi are usually buried just below the sediment surface or protrude slightly. They rarely burrow more than 50–100 mm (2.0–3.9 in) below the surface. In palaeontological assessments, fossils of A. stutchburyi can be used to infer the historical presence of a brackish sheltered environment, although water currents can move shells away from these environments.

=== Population genetics ===
In one study of A. stutchburyi population genetics, the haplotypes (groups of genetic variants) of the cytochrome oxidase I (COI) gene from 29 estuaries were sequenced. The COI gene is used in population genetics studies because it has a predictable and informative rate of mutations that often provides clear indications of when populations have diverged. The study found that the genetic population is more subdivided than open-ocean fauna in the country and that there are six distinct subpopulations. Genetic composition changed significantly near Cook Strait, which separates the North and South Islands. The study suggested that genetic subdivision in A. stutchburyi may reflect limited dispersal in its estuarine habitat relative to open-ocean species. It also noted that A. stutchburyi could disperse long distances to some extent. Another possible explanation for the subdivision is due to historical dispersal barriers that no longer exist, such as glaciation or sea level changes. A third possibility is that some haplotypes are better suited to environmental factors that vary slightly over the country, such as temperature.

== Ecology and behaviour ==
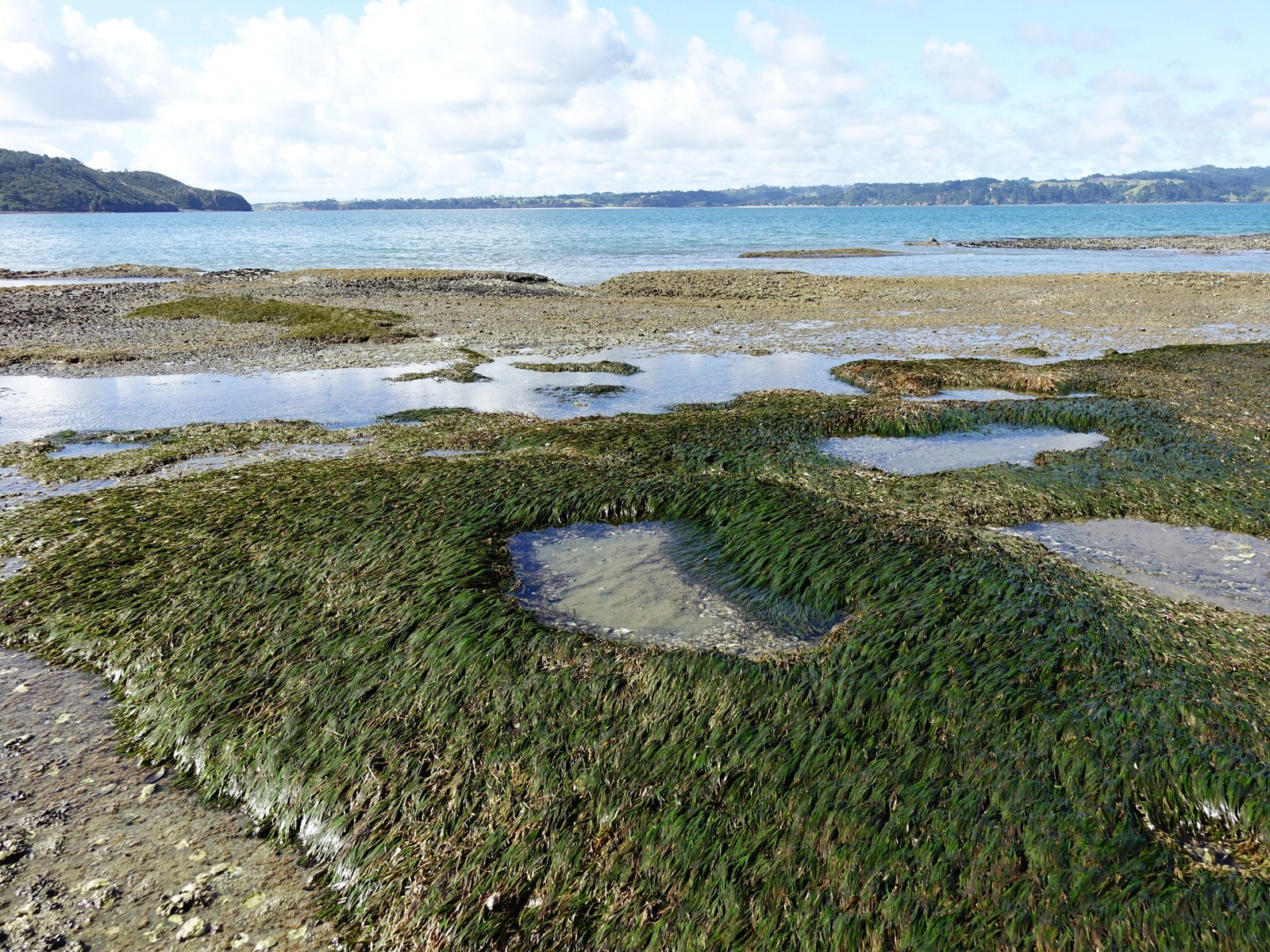
Seagrass (Zostera muelleri), which provides shelter to A. stutchburyi, in the Manukau Harbour

The excretions of A. stutchburyi are a source of ammonium ions, which support primary production (the conversion of inorganic carbon to organic compounds) in the water by photosynthetic microbes when production is limited by nitrogen abundance. It has also been proposed that these photosynthetic microbes promote oxygen uptake by the sediment. There is a correlation between density of A. stutchburyi and seagrass (Zostera muelleri) density. It has been proposed that the two species benefit from shared space, the seagrass providing shelter to A. stutchburyi, thus reducing mortality, while A. stutchburyi releases ammonium ions, which supports growth of the seagrass. However, abundant populations of each can also occur without the other.

Mats of seaweed sometimes overlap in habitat with A. stutchburyi. In laboratory conditions, mats of the red algae Gracilaria chilensis and green algae Ulva lowered the concentration of dissolved oxygen in the sediment by preventing microbes from photosynthesising. As a result, A. stutchburyi buried itself at a shallower depth. In experiments where the dissolved oxygen in the sediment was artificially lowered to mimic these conditions, A. stutchburyi tended to move to the surface, and died after about eleven days. This suggests that seaweed mats have a negative effect on populations of A. stutchburyi.

=== Diet ===
A. stutchburyi is a suspension feeder, meaning it filters organic particles from the water to feed on; inorganic particles (which are inedible) are expelled. In one laboratory study of A. stutchburyi, individuals were subjected to different concentrations of suspended sediment (which the species filters for food). After two days, individuals exposed to intermediate concentrations of suspended sediments had the highest water filtration rates. After fourteen days of exposure, the filtration rates were identical regardless of what concentration of suspended sediment the individuals were exposed to, indicating that the initial differences observed on day two were no longer present. This suggests that the feeding response of A. stutchburyi to increased suspended sediment concentrations (such as those caused by sediment runoff) varies over time.

=== Life history ===
A. stutchburyi is gonochoristic, meaning it has separate sexes. It is inferred to undergo spawning during at least spring and summer. In a laboratory study, A. stutchburyi larvae developed into the veliger stage and settled by attaching to a solid substrate around 20 days after fertilisation. Based on this developmental period, the authors inferred that settlement (also referred to as spatfall) in the ocean most likely occurs between February and May. The juvenile can disperse from unsuitable habitat by crawling with its foot or simply allowing the current to roll it along the surface. The round, robust shape of the shell may assist it in passively rolling with water currents. It can control dispersal by either staying buried or emerging to the surface. It has been inferred that A. stutchburyi can live up to 20 years, but more research is needed to confirm this.

=== Physiology ===
Shell growth rates vary with environmental conditions, leading to considerable differences in shell length at a given age. In one study, A. stutchburyi at 25 mm (0.98 in) in length could be less than two years old at one site, but over eight years old at another site. Some environmental conditions that influence growth rate include salinity (amount of salt dissolved in the water), food availability, temperature and shore level. As A. stutchburyi grows, growth bands can appear in the shell, forming a series of macro and micro growth bands, the macro rings seemingly forming once each year during winter months. Analysis of the shell growth patterns found that A. stutchburyi grows more during summer than winter, and that summer growth was greatest during spring tides and lowest during neap tides. Another study found that A. stutchburyi grew at a rate of 0.17 to 0.35 mm (0.007 to 0.014 in) per month; factors like salinity, concentration of chlorophyll-a (a proxy for photosynthetic microorganisms) and temperature during low tide were the main influences.

A. stutchburyi is able to tolerate a wide range of salinities. In one study, A. stutchburyi struggled to survive in low salinity (1.4%) water with low phytoplankton concentrations, but if phytoplankton concentrations were high, it was able to survive in salinity as low as 0.7%. In contrast, the habitat they were collected from typically had salinity ranging from 2.8% to 3.4%.

There is evidence that A. stutchburyi has an endogenous circatidal rhythm, meaning it can track the tides internally. In laboratory settings, A. stutchburyi has been observed slightly opening its shells and extending its siphon to feed during times corresponding to high tide in its natural habitat, suggesting it maintains an internal rhythm synchronised with the tidal cycle. As this pattern went out of sync over time, it is unlikely it relies entirely on this internal rhythm.

== Predation and parasites ==
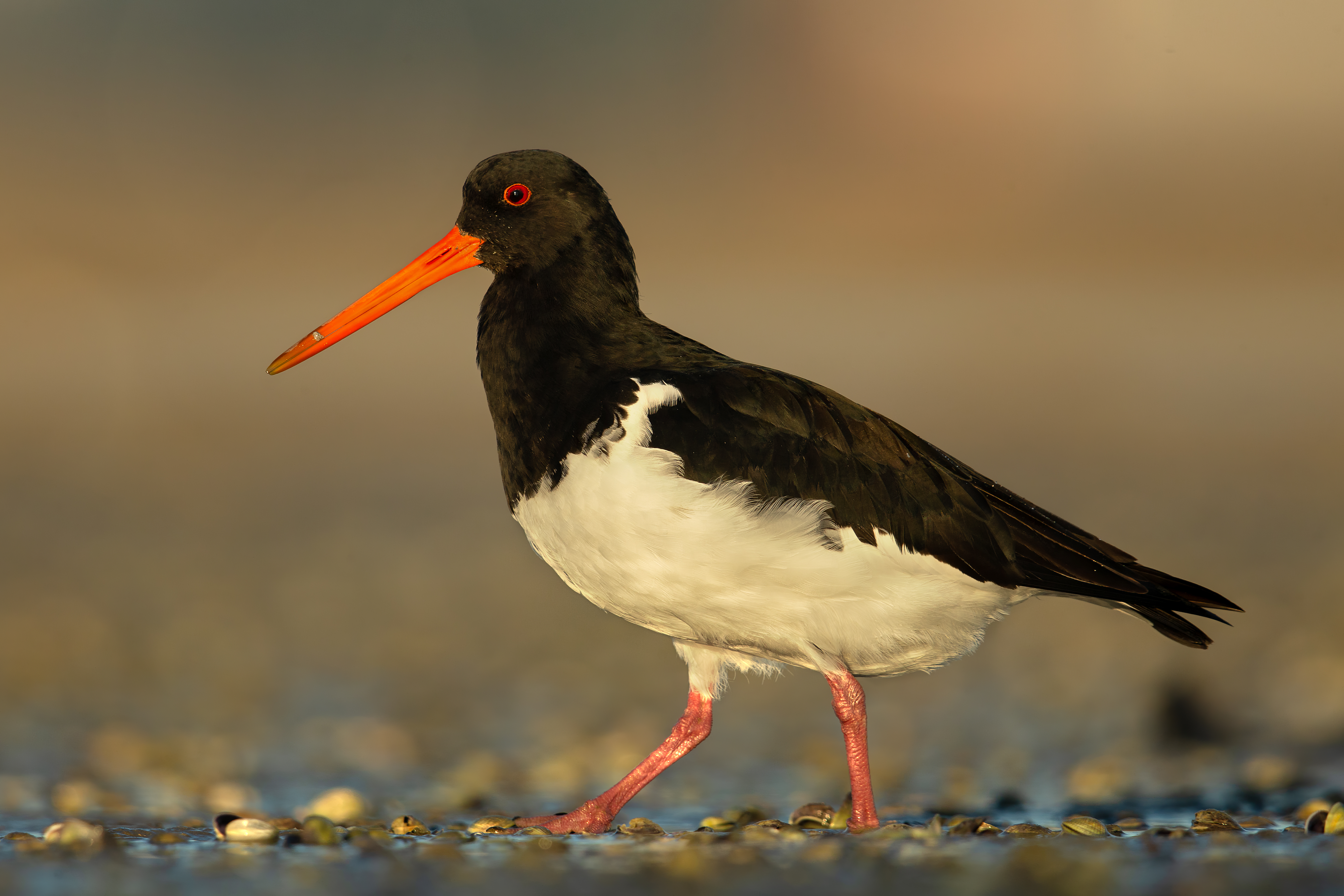
The South Island oystercatcher (Haematopus finschi) preys on A. stutchburyi.

A. stutchburyi is preyed upon by estuarine animals such as crabs, wading birds (such as oystercatchers), large whelks and stingrays. Juvenile A. stutchburyi have a weaker shell and are more vulnerable to predation. In a laboratory setting, the presence of several adults had a sheltering effect that improved juvenile survival rates in the presence of paddle crabs (Ovalipes catharus), which can break shells open with their claw.

A. stutchburyi is infected by the larvae of the trematode parasites Curtuteria australis and Acanthoparyphium. These parasites damage A. stutchburyi's ability to burrow into the mud, causing them to lay exposed on the surface where they are eaten by birds. C. australis specifically infects the South Island oystercatcher (Haematopus finschi) when the bird consumes infected A. stutchburyi. Inside the birds, the larvae lay eggs which then exit the body, hatching into their next stage and entering the digestive system of whelks. The parasite develops in the whelk and later emerges as a free-swimming form which penetrates the foot of A. stutchburyi, restarting the cycle. In an experiment, individuals of A. stutchburyi that were infected with C. australis had reduced growth rates, weight and foot length, which may explain their inability to burrow. Populations subjected to commercial harvesting have higher proportions of individuals infected with C. australis and Acanthoparyphium than those not commercially harvested. This may be because the higher population densities of unharvested areas lowers the chance of any single individual encountering the parasites.

Other trematodes parasitising A. stutchburyi include Cercaria chiltoni, an undescribed species of Gymnophallus and an undescribed species of Acanthoparyphium. The copepod Pseudomyicola spinosus also lodges in the mantle cavity (a gap between the main body mass and mantle) of A. stutchburyi, where it causes damage to the epidermis of the mantle cavity. This damage assists the parasite by allowing it to more easily adhere to the animal. A. stutchburyi harbours a very diverse virome (collection of viruses in an organism). An investigation into the viruses found in A. stutchburyi revealed that it contains at least 213 virus species, most of which were unknown. The most common viruses were Picornavirales, which are abundant in marine habitats and have a wide range of hosts. None of the viruses detected are known to be pathogens to humans or bivalves and no negative effect on A. stutchburyi was reported.

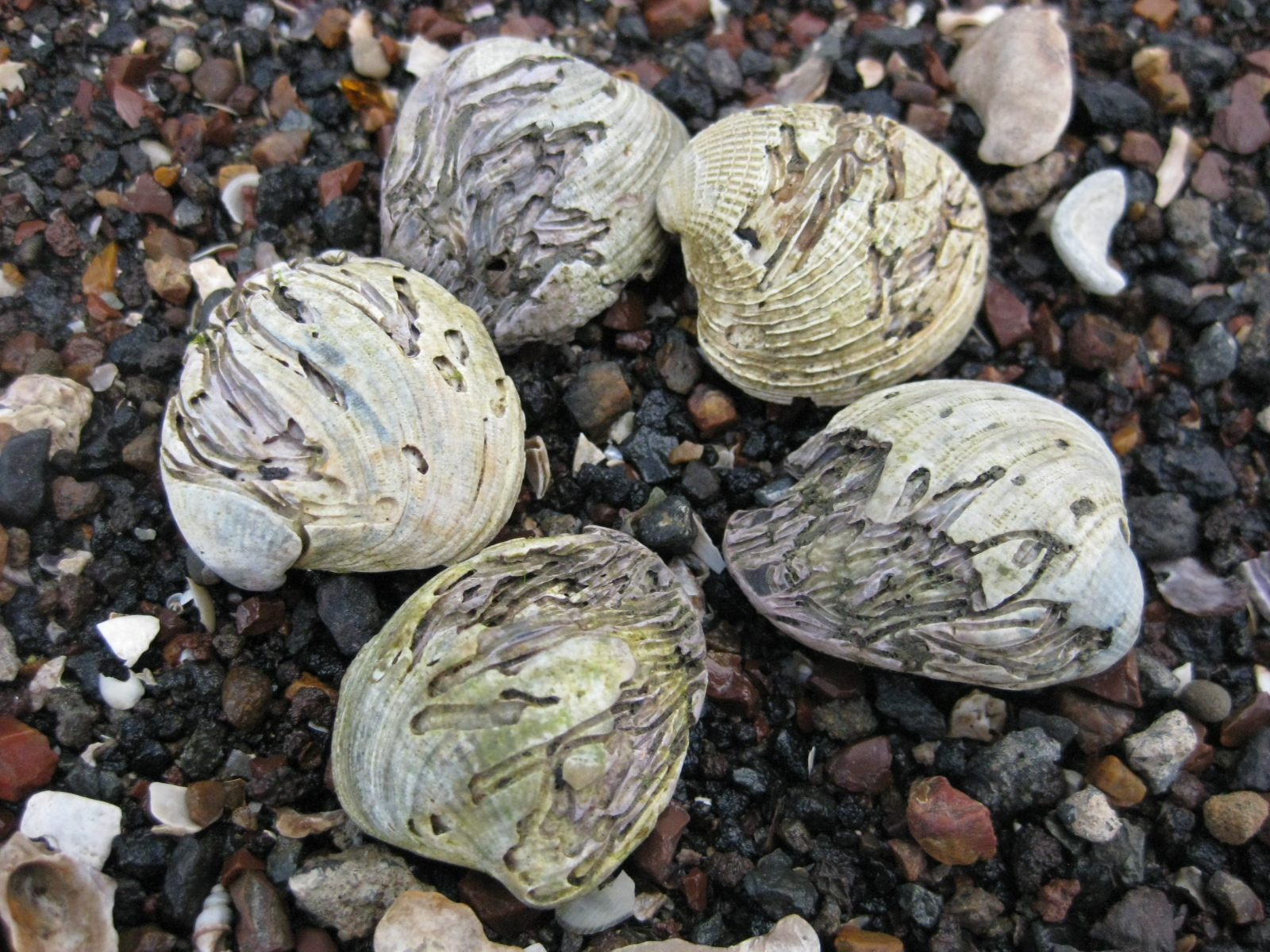
A. stutchburyi shells with holes bored into them by Boccardia acus

The shell of A. stutchburyi can be bored into by the polychaeta worm Boccardia acus, which leaves distinctive grooves in the shell's outer surface. If the worm bores near where the adductor muscle attaches to the shell, it may become more difficult for A. stutchburyi to move. This makes A. stutchburyi more vulnerable to predation, which puts B. acus at risk as well. In one study, smaller A. stutchburyi individuals (less than 11 mm (0.43 in) in length) were never damaged by B. acus, but larger individuals tended to have more worms boring into them. The density of B. acus appears to be highly dependent on the density of A. stutchburyi.

A. stutchburyi has been observed to have parts of its foot bitten off, although this injury is non-fatal. It is not known what predators do this, but evidence suggests it may be bottom-feeding fish. The foot can partially regenerate in up to eight weeks, during which time A. stutchburyi may be unable to burrow into the sediment, leaving it vulnerable to further predation, temperature stress and drying out. In one study, it was estimated that 14% to 34% of A. stutchburyi had been damaged by such foot cropping.

== Relationship to humans ==
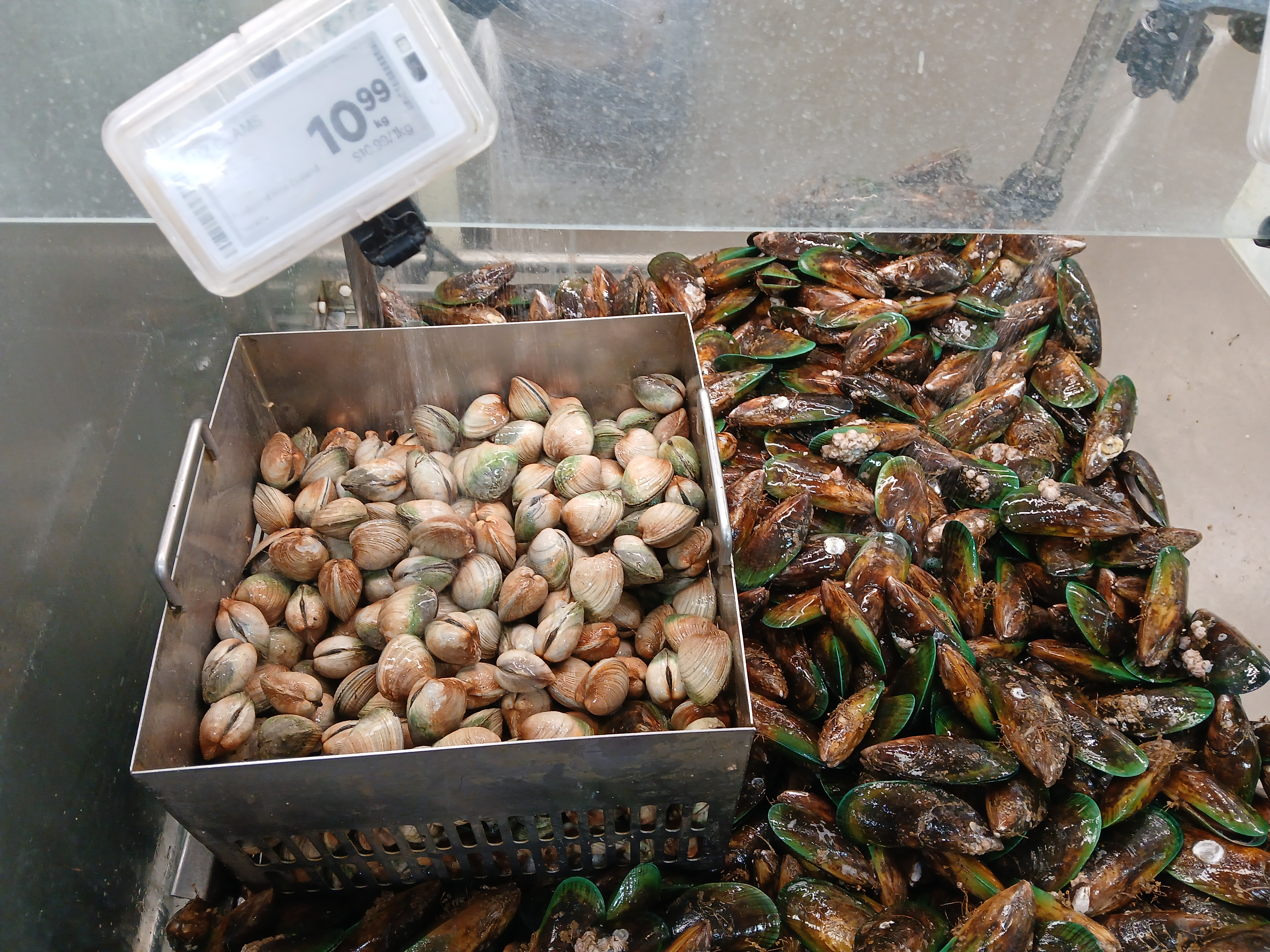
Live A. stutchburyi (left) being sold in a supermarket

Throughout New Zealand, A. stutchburyi is harvested non-commercially, the amount varying substantially from location to location. There is a history of commercial A. stutchburyi harvest in the Whangarei, Dunedin and Tasman regions. Since October 2002, the commercial harvesting of A. stutchburyi is managed under New Zealand's Quota Management System, which imposes limits on the amount of A. stutchburyi that can be taken for commercial purposes. The government also runs a quality assurance programme that monitors the ecological health of all harvesting areas used for human consumption. Outside these areas, A. stutchburyi can only be sold as fishing bait.

In Dunedin, commercial harvesting occurs on Otago Peninsula at Papanui Inlet, at Waitati Inlet (Blueskin Bay) and in Otago Harbour. Harvesting of the two inlets began in 1983 with a catch limit of 104 tonnes. Although commercial harvesting was not allowed in Otago Harbour, a special permit was granted in 2009 to test the ecological effects of harvesting. Once this permit lapsed in 2017, the regulations were modified the next year to allow commercial harvesting at Port Chalmers and Sawyers Bay. Since 2002, the combined maximum annual catch limit for commercial harvesting in the Dunedin area is 1,470 tonnes. Reported commercial harvesting in the region has stayed well below this limit.

In the Tasman region, A. stutchburyi is harvested at Pakawau Beach in Golden Bay. Commercial harvesting started in 1984, the first significant catches occurring from 1986 onwards. A. stutchburyi is also harvested from Tapu Bay in Tasman Bay and Ferry Point in Golden Bay since 1992 and 1998, respectively. Since 2002, the maximum annual catch limit for commercial harvesting in the area is 1,390 tonnes, but the total reported catch is far below this limit, the lowest catch being 65 tonnes in 2023–24 and the highest at 569 tonnes in 2002–03.

In the Whangarei region, A. stutchburyi was only harvested from Snake Bank in Whangārei Harbour. From 2002 onwards, the combined maximum annual catch limit for commercial harvesting in the Whangarei region was 346 tonnes. Due to low biomass of A. stutchburyi, harvesting slowly declined over time and the fishery has been closed since late 2012. During the last few years harvesting was occurring, there were sewage and stormwater overflow incidents that caused temporary closures.

=== Shellfish poisoning ===
Brevetoxin B5

Like other species of shellfish, A. stutchburyi is capable of causing neurotoxic shellfish poisoning in humans after exposure to red tides, which release toxins into the water that are subsequently absorbed by A. stutchburyi. Following a shellfish poisoning outbreak in 1993, two brevetoxins (naturally occurring toxins harmful to the nervous tissue), brevetoxin B1 (BTX-B1) and brevetoxin B5 (BTX-B5), were isolated from A. stutchburyi. The latter was also found in the bivalves Perna canaliculus and Crassostrea gigas. In a laboratory study, A. stutchburyi broke down brevetoxins PbTx-2 to PbTx-3, BTX-B5 and BTX-B1. The study proposed that PbTx-3 and BTX-B5 may be effective markers for monitoring hazardous shellfish since these toxins persisted in A. stutchburyi the longest, thus being easier to detect.

=== In Māori culture ===
A. stutchburyi is a traditional food source for Māori people. Middens (old dump sites for domestic waste) dating back to pre-European contact often contained shells of A. stutchburyi. The shells in middens can be used to make inferences about historical Māori activity and changes in the species' populations. In the Bay of Islands, middens are rich in remains of A. stutchburyi, suggesting that in was a dietary staple in the area. The shells are also notably larger than in current day, indicating that the modern populations are being hindered by increased sedimentation and reduced resistance to parasites. In another study, the growth rates of A. stutchburyi from six midden sites around New Zealand were all found to have decreased from AD 1300 to present day. Like in the Bay of Islands, it was suggested that this was due to increased sedimentation. Since 1998, Māori often have customary fishing rights to harvest A. stutchburyi in some areas of cultural significance.

== Conservation and threats ==
=== Restoration ===
Because A. stutchyburyi populations have been depleted by harvesting and changes to their habitat in some areas, there is interest in restoring the cockle beds (dense colonies of A. stutchburyi). One attempted method is to transplant new individuals into these depleted areas. Although studies have attempted this, little information is known about how effective this method is at restoring new populations, and research is ongoing. In one study, transplantation was attempted in Whangārei Harbour. After one year, 30% of A. stutchburyi remained in the original area they were deposited; the others dispersed away. Although sometimes A. stutchburyi may be kept in cages after transplantation to protect them from predators, this increases mortality, possibly due to stress. The study also concluded that, although the density of transplanted A. stutchburyi may initially decline due to individuals dispersing, high density cockle beds will eventually develop. The ability of larvae to disperse to new localities depends heavily on the site they originate from. Larvae in more sheltered areas may disperse only a short distance, whereas those in more turbulent areas could disperse further. As such, the location of restoration sites will impact how easily the newly established populations spread.

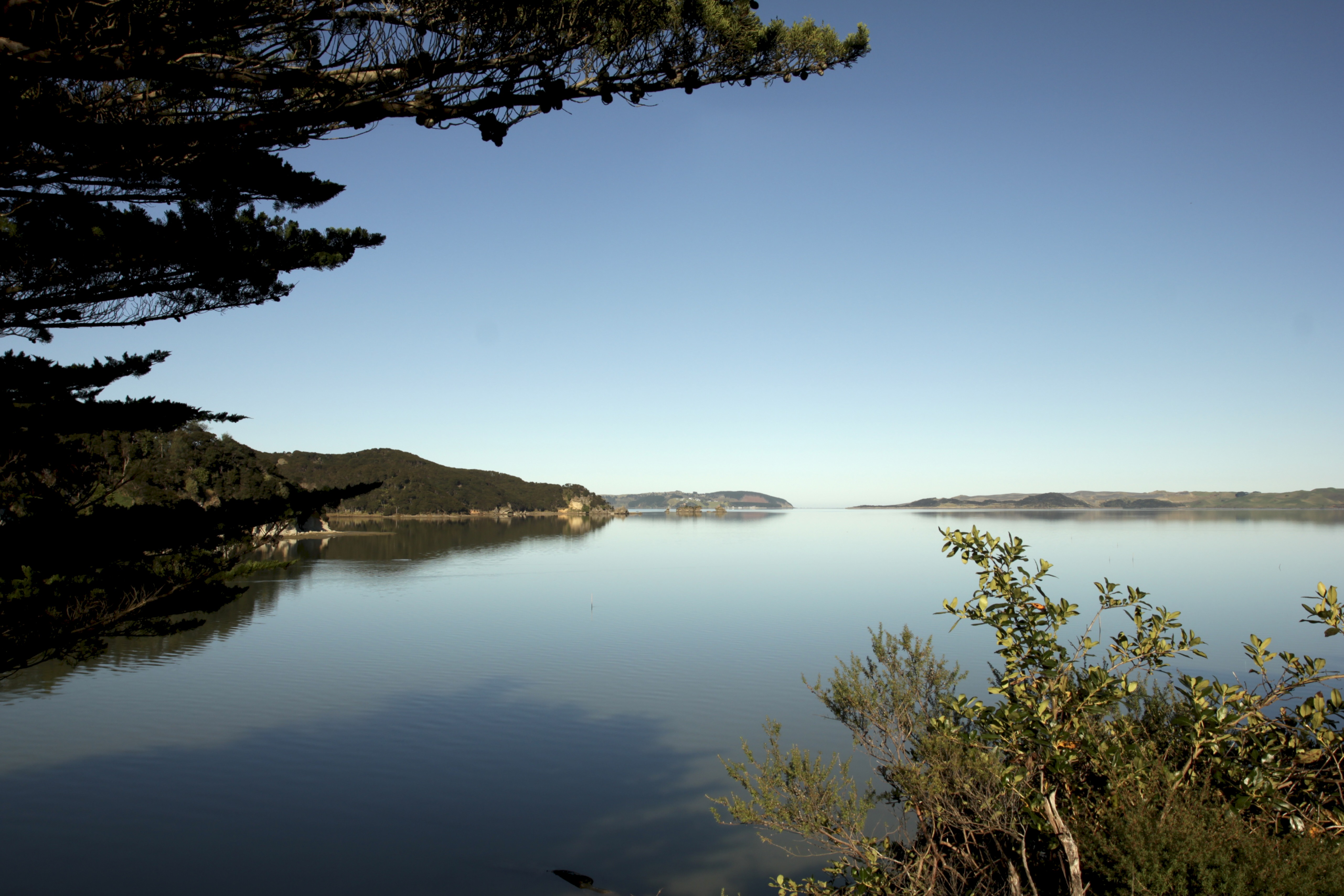
Aotea Harbour in the Waikato region is an example of a mātaitai reserve, where commercial harvesting is banned and permission is needed from the local iwi to harvest marine life.

Another way to restore cockle beds is to ban or restrict harvesting at the affected site, either temporarily or permanently. The Māori practices of taiāpure, mātaitai reserves and rāhui can be used for regulating the harvesting of A. stutchburyi or other marine life. In a taiāpure (local fishery), a management committee nominated by the tangata whenua (local Māori) may recommend regulations that restrict the quantities or sizes that may be taken, the areas or seasons in which they may be taken, or the harvesting methods used, and the fisheries minister approves the regulations. In a mātaitai (seafood) reserve, commercial harvesting is generally prohibited. The tangata whenua may recommend bylaws for governing non-commercial harvesting, and the fisheries minister approves them. Harvesting may be halted entirely by a temporary ban or rāhui. Fully protected marine reserves would also protect A. stutchburyi populations, but most of these have been established in predominantly rocky areas where the species does not occur. Some research has found the closure of harvesting alone may not be enough to restore some populations.

=== Sedimentation ===
When large amounts of sediment are suddenly deposited in their habitat from storms or dredging, A. stutchburyi populations can be buried and potentially smothered. It has been reported that A. stutchburyi is capable of resurfacing when buried up to 250 mm (9.8 in) of sediment, so it is capable of responding to some degree. However, sediment deposition events are still hazardous to A. stutchburyi. There are estuaries where layers of dead A. stutchburyi can be found 1 m (3.3 ft) below the surface, apparently after being smothered by sediment. Single burial events are hazardous to A. stutchburyi, but continuous burial events may be even more dangerous. One study found that short-term increases in sedimentation (such as during large storms) and the associated increase in water turbidity will not impact the health of A. stutchburyi, but long term increases (such as regular dredging) may negatively affect the species.

=== Bioaccumulation ===
Because A. stutchburyi filter feeds for nutrients, it also picks up contaminants that have leached into the environment, such as heavy metals, a process termed bioaccumulation. As such, A. stutchburyi may be useful a bioindicator for pollution in the environment. This has been demonstrated in A. stutchburyi from Orewa estuary near Auckland, which were found to have accumulated metals such as lead, zinc and copper. The amount of metals present in A. stutchburyi from Otago Harbour varied, but levels were generally much higher near the city. A. stutchburyi is also capable of accumulating organic contaminants. One study examined the bioaccumulation in A. stutchburyi from Manukau Harbour by four classes of organic contaminants derived from human activities: organochlorine, polychlorinated biphenyls, polynuclear aromatic hydrocarbons and chlorophenols. It found that contaminants negatively affected the population, although the concentrations detected in A. stutchburyi were not as high as in the large wedge shell (Macomona liliana), another bivalve living in the harbour. The accumulation of trace metals in A. stutchburyi can vary depending on its location, body size and age. For example, the concentrations of silver, arsenic, cobalt and chromium increased with age, but lead and zinc concentration decreased. In one study, ratios of trace elements such as zinc to calcium in the shell of A. stutchburyi could be used to distinguish between populations in four estuaries and eight sites within a single harbour. Because of this, it has been hypothesised that trace elements can be used to estimate the connectivity of populations.

=== Mass mortality events ===
Populations of A. stutchburyi can occasionally suffer from mass mortality events, where large numbers of individuals suddenly die. One such event killed around 60% of the population in the Whangateau Harbour near Auckland in 2009. This was likely due to unusually high temperatures during mid-afternoon low tides in the spring that stressed A. stutchburyi and made it vulnerable to infection, possibly by Mycobacteria or other microorganisms. Surveys have since found that the populations in the harbour are recovering as of 2021, but also noted that individuals large enough for harvesting are largely absent, indicating that population recovery is slow. Another study found that the sudden reduction in A. stutchburyi population had little influence on ecosystem dynamics, as it did not significantly impact phytoplankton biomass.

=== Sea level rise ===
As a result of climate change, there has been a rise in sea levels which is predicted to continue, restricting intertidal zones and changing currents and tides. These changes to the estuarine habitats occupied by A. stutchburyi are expected to reduce the suitable habitat available for the species. One modelling study in Tauranga Harbour, predicted to lose 79% of its intertidal area by the end of 2100, suggested that A. stutchburyi populations would have significantly lowered densities as a result of sea level rise.
