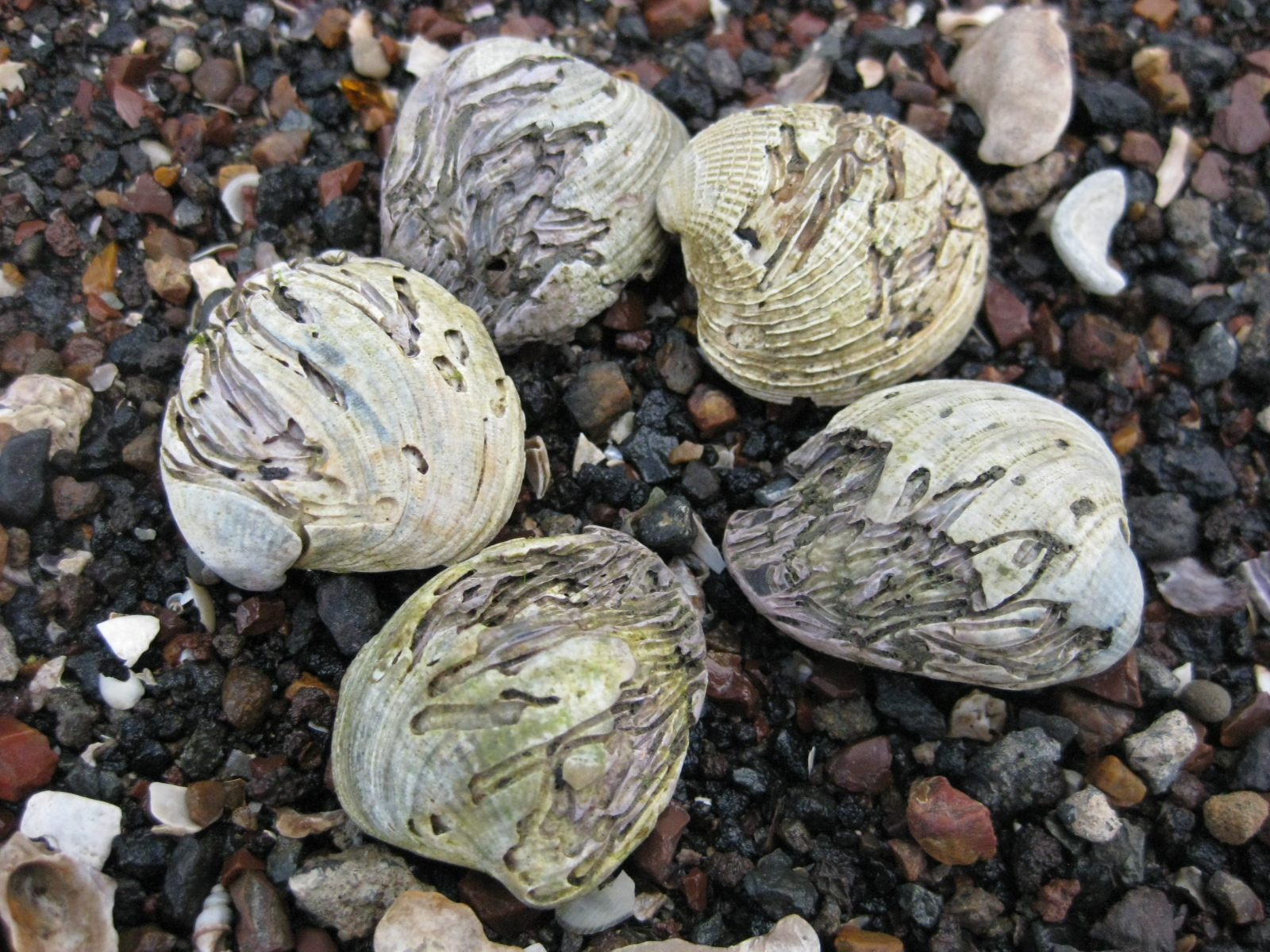
- Grooves on the shell of Austrovenus stutchburyi created by B. acus

Scientific classification
- Kingdom: Animalia
- Phylum: Annelida
- Clade: Pleistoannelida
- Clade: Sedentaria
- Order: Spionida
- Family: Spionidae
- Genus: Boccardia
- Species: B. acus

Binomial name
- Boccardia acus (Rainer, 1973)

= Boccardia acus =

Species of annelid worm

Boccardia acus is a species of annelid worm from the family Spionidae.

== Biology ==
B. acus bores into the shell of Austrovenus stutchburyi (New Zealand cockle), which groves on the surface of the shell. As a result of the worm boring into the shell where the adductor muscle of A. stutchburyi attaches, it weakens the muscle and makes it difficult for the cockle to move. As a result of this, both A. stutchburyi and B. acus become more vulnerable to predation.
