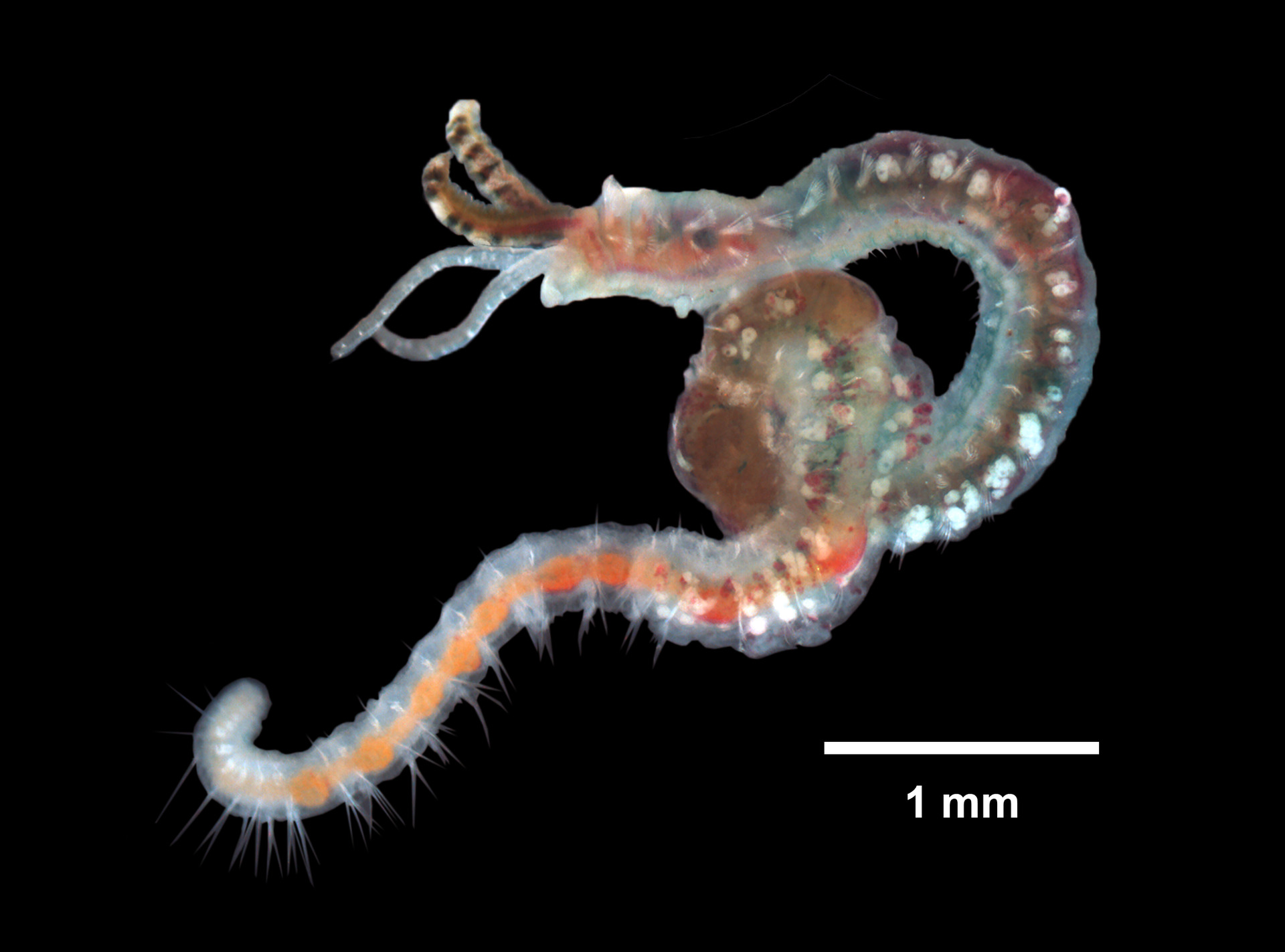

Scientific classification
- Kingdom: Animalia
- Phylum: Annelida
- Clade: Pleistoannelida
- Clade: Sedentaria
- Order: Spionida
- Family: Spionidae
- Genus: Streblospio
- Species: S. benedicti

Binomial name
- Streblospio benedicti Webster, 1879

= Streblospio benedicti =

Species of annelid

Streblospio benedicti (also called the Ram's horn worm) is a small polychaete native to the Western Atlantic, where its distribution ranges from the Gulf of Saint Lawrence to Venezuela. Sexual maturity is reached at around 9 to 14 weeks and populations and individuals may vary during development. It can be found in the mudflats and soft sediments of estuaries and coastal waters. Its general habitat includes oyster reefs, mangroves, grass beds, marinas, and docks while the tidal range where S. benedicti can be found is subtidal to intertidal. Additionally, S. benedicti can tolerate a broad range of temperatures and salinities. Due to its tolerance of high organic contents, S. benedicti is a pioneer organism of new habitats that it settles in. Furthermore, despite its small size, only reaching a maximum of 20 mm (0.79 in) in length, S. benedicti plays an important role in estuarine food webs as it can reach high population densities and is a substantial grazer of phytoplankton.

== Distribution ==
Streblospio benedicti is native to the Western Atlantic ranging from the Gulf of Saint Lawrence to Venezuela, but its distribution can reach as far as Japan. Streblospio benedicti was first found in San Francisco bay where it was most abundant in the soft sediments of the bay. It was then reported to be found in Elkhorn Slough, South of San Francisco Bay, and even further South in Mexico, in the Topolobampo lagoon on the Gulf of California and the Urias estuary near Mazatlan. The distribution range of Streblospio benedicti also includes the Northeast Atlantic such as Ireland, France, and Belgium. There have also been reports of Streblospio benedicti from the Caribbean and the Mediterranean Sea, and the Black and Caspian Seas.

== Habitat and ecology ==
Streblospio benedicti is common in estuarine habitats. They are typically found in muddy or soft-sediment areas, such as mudflats, seagrass beds, and marshes. The species is also adapted to rapid colonization, due to its capacity for small-scale dispersal following larval development. S. benedicti is known to flourish in physical environments where there have been random or environmental disturbances, due to lessened competition in these areas. The Ram's Horn Worm is known as an opportunistic pioneering species for this reason, as it tends to explore newly disturbed areas. Much of the ability to traverse these environmentally altered areas, is due to S. benedicti's tolerance for pollution. The species is also generally able to tolerate a broad range of salinity. However, population levels are known to decrease with the decrease of salinity levels in their environment. The same is true for temperature, as the species is generally able to tolerate a large range of temperatures. Though, it is speculated that cold water temperatures can limit the occurrence of S. benedicti in some habitats during winter and spring. Streblospio benedicti is also a relatively long-lived species, as individuals tend to exhibit lifespans ranging from 30 to 75 weeks.

=== Competition and predation ===
S. benedicti is a specialist when it comes to finding resources, and is a generalist in terms of discovering habitats. However, if resources are limited, the species has proven to be a capable competitor. Due to its tendency to reside in sediment surfaces, Streblospio benedicti is quite vulnerable to epibenthic predators. These include organisms such as blue crabs, grass shrimp, and flounder.

== Morphology ==
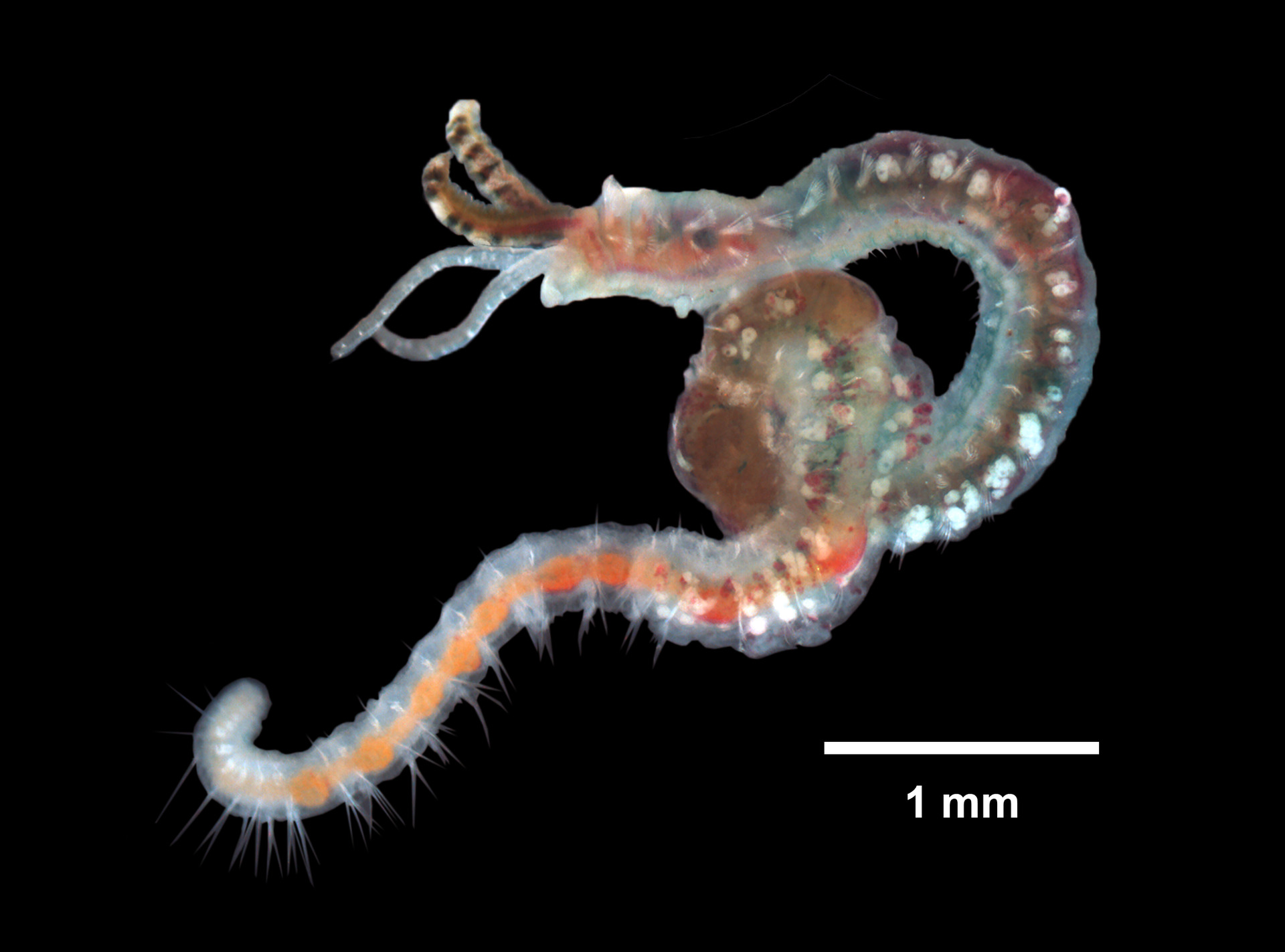
Streblospio benedicti

Streblospio benedicti is a small (6–20 mm (0.24–0.79 in) in length) polychaete. It is segmented and looks like a tube or worm. It has a cone-shaped head with four eyes, feeding palps and gills. Usually rusty, red-brown color, its gills have green bands. It's morphologically very similar to S. gynobranchiata, a closely related species. Its morphology is similar to many spionidae polychaetes (a family of marine worms). Other species that Streblospio benedicti are mistaken for include Streblospio shrubsoli and Streblospio benedicti japonica. The morphology of feeding palps and cilia were found to be shared between both Streblospio benedicti and Streblospio shrubsoli. However, they did have different morphological functions of papillae.

== Reproduction ==
Streblospio benedicti reproduces sexually and has two separate sexes. They typically experience high rates of reproduction and high growth rates. Females have pouches, called dorsal brood pouches, which are used to incubate the embryos during the early stages of development. The species is poecilogonous, which means that the females exhibit two distinct reproductive strategies during early larval development. These strategies are genetically determined and differ in their brood development. Both forms of development can also occur within the same population. In planktotrophic brood development, some females will produce large amounts of small eggs, which are around 60-70 μm in diameter. These developed larvae typically have long swimming setae and will live in and feed on plankton for a period of up to seven weeks. Lecithotrophic brood development occurs when the females produce fewer amounts of large eggs, which are around 100-200 μm in diameter. In contrast to the planktotrophic offspring, the lecithotrophic larvae lack the swimming setae. They are physically capable of immediate settlement but they will typically remain in the water column for a period ranging from a couple of hours to one week.

== Usage ==
Streblospio benedicti is commonly used as an indicator organism for marine nutrient pollution.
