= Aonides trifida =

Scientific classification
- Domain: Eukaryota
- Kingdom: Animalia
- Phylum: Annelida
- Clade: Pleistoannelida
- Clade: Sedentaria
- Order: Spionida
- Family: Spionidae
- Genus: Aonides
- Species: A. trifida

Binomial name
- Aonides trifida Estcourt, 1967

Species of annelid worm

Aonides trifida is a bristle worm from the Spionidae family. Aonides trifida has a pointed head, two pairs of eyes and grows up to 100mm in length. Aonides trifida is a surface deposit feeder and bioturbator which tolerates a sediment mud content up to 80%, but has an optimum range of 0-5%.
