= Prionospio aucklandica =

Scientific classification
- Domain: Eukaryota
- Kingdom: Animalia
- Phylum: Annelida
- Clade: Pleistoannelida
- Clade: Sedentaria
- Order: Spionida
- Family: Spionidae
- Genus: Prionospio
- Species: P. aucklandica

Binomial name
- Prionospio aucklandica (Augener, 1923)

Species of annelid worm

Prionospio aucklandica is a spionid worm. Prionospio aucklandica is distributed throughout New Zealand.
