= Dipolydora commensalis =

Scientific classification
- Kingdom: Animalia
- Phylum: Annelida
- Clade: Pleistoannelida
- Clade: Sedentaria
- Order: Spionida
- Family: Spionidae
- Genus: Dipolydora
- Species: D. commensalis

Binomial name
- Dipolydora commensalis (Andrews, 1891)

Synonyms
- Polydora ciliata brevipalpa Zachs, 1933; Polydora commensalis Andrews, 1891

Species of annelid worm

Dipolydora commensalis is a species of polychaete worm in the family Spionidae. It has a commensal relationship with a hermit crab and occurs on the lower shore of coasts on the western side of the Atlantic Ocean.

== Ecology ==
Dipolydora commensalis is a burrowing worm that invariably bores into a gastropod mollusc shell that is being used by a hermit crab. The burrow usually starts at the columella at the side of the shell's aperture and a thin calcareous tube is secreted extending internally to the apex of the shell. The worm lives in this tube with its anterior end projecting.

A pair of palps on the prostomium (first segment) catch food particles floating past. The worm uses both cilia and muscles to move the particles down a ciliary groove to its mouth. The worm is able to reject inedible material at the mouth and may be able to reject such material as it traverses the palps.

The palps are able to regrow if they are damaged by movements of the hermit crab, and both the anterior and posterior parts of the worm are able to regenerate if it gets severed. In the laboratory, worms can live for four years, rather longer than most empty gastropod shells.

This worm has been found to have a commensal relationship with nine different species of hermit crab. The worm is likely to gain advantage from the crab's mobility and the protection from predators that the crab's presence affords, as well as the avoidance of being overwhelmed by silt. Periodically a hermit crab will leave its shell in order to move into a larger one. During this period of vacancy, the worm is able to use nutrient granules stored in the wall of the gut. There is usually competition among hermit crabs for vacant shells, so the empty shell is likely soon to be reoccupied. It is likely that the hermit crab recognises the worm associated with it and does not attack it, but this aspect has not been studied in this species; however, in the case of some other commensal polychaete worms, such as Neanthes fucata, it has been demonstrated.
