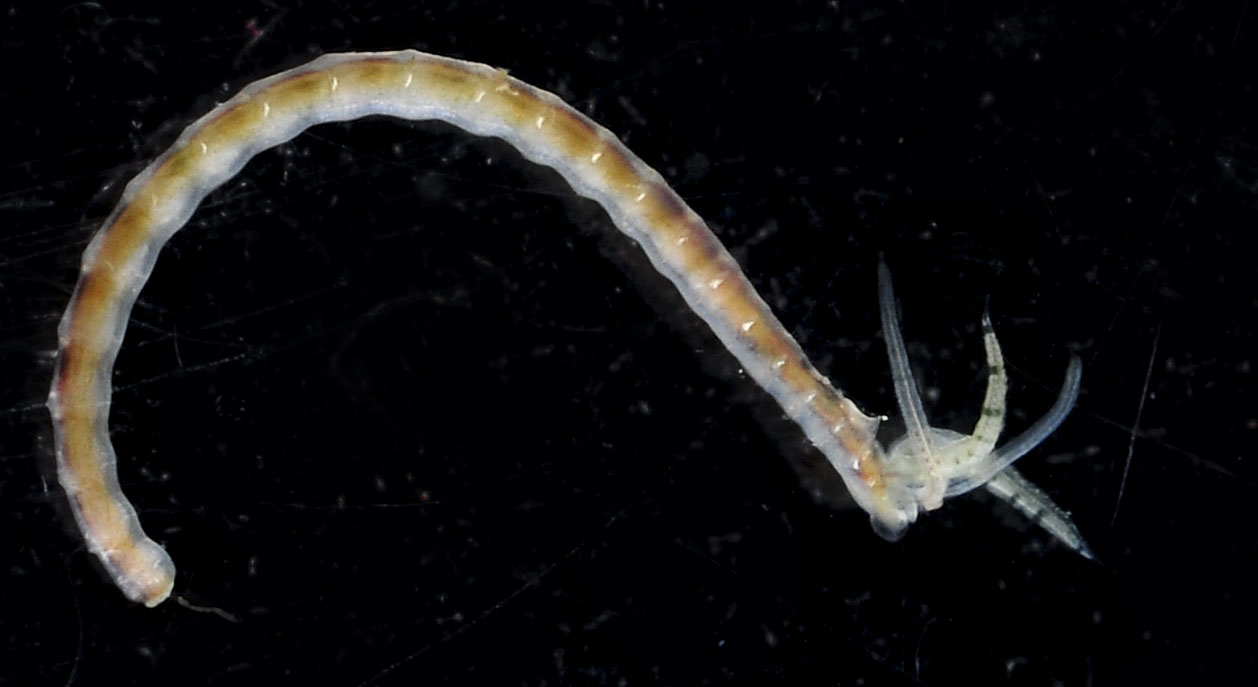
- Streblospio benedicti

Scientific classification
- Kingdom: Animalia
- Phylum: Annelida
- Clade: Pleistoannelida
- Clade: Sedentaria
- Order: Spionida
- Family: Spionidae
- Genus: Streblospio; Webster, 1879

= Streblospio =

Genus of annelid worms

Streblospio is a genus of polychaetes belonging to the family Spionidae.

The species of this genus are found in Europe, America.

Species:

- Streblospio benedicti Webster, 1879
- Streblospio eridani Munari, Wolf, Infantini, Moro, Sfriso & Mistri, 2020
- Streblospio eunateae Martínez & Adarraga, 2019
- Streblospio eunatei Martínez & Adarraga, 2019
- Streblospio gynobranchiata Rice & Levin, 1998
- Streblospio japonica Imajima, 1990
- Streblospio padventralis Delgado-Blas, Díaz-Díaz & Viéitez, 2018
- Streblospio shrubsolii (Buchanan, 1890)
