= Prionospio =

Scientific classification
- Kingdom: Animalia
- Phylum: Annelida
- Clade: Pleistoannelida
- Clade: Sedentaria
- Order: Spionida
- Family: Spionidae
- Genus: Prionospio; Malmgren, 1867

Genus of annelids

Prionospio is a genus of annelids belonging to the family Spionidae.

The genus has cosmopolitan distribution.

Species:

- Prionospio acuta Peixoto & Paiva, 2020
- Prionospio alexandrae Peixoto & Paiva, 2020
- Prionospio aluta Maciolek, 1985
- Prionospio amarsupiata Neal & Altamira, 2016
- Prionospio anatolica Dagli & Çinar, 2011
- Prionospio andamanensis Hylleberg & Nateewathana, 1991
- Prionospio anneae Radashevsky, 2015
- Prionospio anuncata Fauchald, 1972
- Prionospio atrovitta Gopal, Parameswaran, Abdul Jaleel & Saravanane, 2020
- Prionospio aucklandica Augener, 1923
- Prionospio austella Delgado-Blas, 2015
- Prionospio australiensis Blake & Kudenov, 1978
- Prionospio biancoi Peixoto & Paiva, 2020
- Prionospio bocki Söderström, 1920
- Prionospio branchilucida Altamira, Glover & Paterson, 2016
- Prionospio capensis McIntosh, 1885
- Prionospio caribensis Delgado-Blas, 2014
- Prionospio caspersi Laubier, 1962
- Prionospio cerastae Radashevsky, 2015
- Prionospio chilensis Hartmann-Schröder, 1962
- Prionospio cinthyae Peixoto & Paiva, 2020
- Prionospio cirrifera Wirén, 1883
- Prionospio convexa Imajima, 1990
- Prionospio cooki Radashevsky, 2015
- Prionospio coorilla Wilson, 1990
- Prionospio cornuta Hylleberg & Nateewathana, 1991
- Prionospio corrugata Peixoto & Paiva, 2020
- Prionospio crassumbranchiata Delgado-Blas, 2015
- Prionospio cristata Foster, 1971
- Prionospio cristaventralis Delgado-Blas, Díaz-Díaz & Viéitez, 2018
- Prionospio dayi (Foster, 1969)
- Prionospio decipiens Söderström, 1920
- Prionospio delta Hartman, 1965
- Prionospio depauperata Imajima, 1990
- Prionospio dubia Day, 1961
- Prionospio dubia Maciolek, 1985
- Prionospio ehlersi Fauvel, 1928
- Prionospio elegantula Imajima, 1990
- Prionospio elongata Imajima, 1990
- Prionospio ergeni Dagli & Çinar, 2009
- Prionospio fallax Söderström, 1920
- Prionospio fauchaldi Maciolek, 1985
- Prionospio festiva (Grube, 1872)
- Prionospio fosterae Peixoto & Paiva, 2020
- Prionospio grossa Imajima, 1990
- Prionospio hartmanae Peixoto & Paiva, 2020
- Prionospio henriki Hylleberg & Nateewathana, 1991
- Prionospio hermesia Neal & Paterson, 2016
- Prionospio heterobranchia Moore, 1907
- Prionospio jamaicensis Delgado-Blas, 2014
- Prionospio japonica Okuda, 1935
- Prionospio jonatani Delgado-Blas, 2015
- Prionospio jubata Blake, 1996
- Prionospio kaplani Altamira, Glover & Paterson, 2016
- Prionospio kinbergi Peixoto & Paiva, 2020
- Prionospio kingbergi Peixoto & Paiva, 2020
- Prionospio kirrae Wilson, 1990
- Prionospio komaeti Hylleberg & Nateewathana, 1991
- Prionospio krusadensis Fauvel, 1929
- Prionospio kulin Wilson, 1990
- Prionospio laciniosa Maciolek, 1985
- Prionospio lanceolata Hartmann-Schröder, 1979
- Prionospio lighti Maciolek, 1985
- Prionospio lineata Imajima, 1990
- Prionospio lobulata Fauchald, 1972
- Prionospio lylei Radashevsky, 2015
- Prionospio maciolekae Dagli & Çinar, 2011
- Prionospio malayensis Caullery, 1914
- Prionospio malmgreni Claparède, 1869
- Prionospio marsupialia Blake, 1996
- Prionospio membranacea Imajima, 1990
- Prionospio multibranchiata Berkeley, 1927
- Prionospio multicristata Hutchings & Rainer, 1979
- Prionospio multipinnulata (Blake & Kudenov, 1978)
- Prionospio mutata Peixoto & Paiva, 2020
- Prionospio neenae Hylleberg & Nateewathana, 1991
- Prionospio newportensis Reish, 1959
- Prionospio nielseni Hylleberg & Nateewathana, 1991
- Prionospio nirripa Wilson, 1990
- Prionospio nonatoi Peixoto & Paiva, 2019
- Prionospio nova Annenkova, 1938
- Prionospio oligopinnulata Delgado-Blas, 2015
- Prionospio orensanzi Blake, 1983
- Prionospio oshimensis Imajima, 1990
- Prionospio pacifica Zhou & Li, 2009
- Prionospio paradisea Imajima, 1990
- Prionospio parapari Delgado-Blas, Díaz-Díaz & Viéitez, 2018
- Prionospio patagonica Augener, 1923
- Prionospio paucipinnulata Blake & Kudenov, 1978
- Prionospio perkinsi Maciolek, 1985
- Prionospio peruana Hartmann-Schröder, 1962
- Prionospio phuketensis Hylleberg & Nateewathana, 1991
- Prionospio plumosa M.Sars, 1872
- Prionospio polybranchiata Fauvel, 1929
- Prionospio pulchra Imajima, 1990
- Prionospio pygmaeus Hartman, 1961
- Prionospio pyramidalis (Hutchings & Turvey, 1984)
- Prionospio quadrilamellata Peixoto & Paiva, 2020
- Prionospio queenslandica Blake & Kudenov, 1978
- Prionospio rikardoi Martínez & Adarraga, 2019
- Prionospio rosariae Delgado-Blas, 2014
- Prionospio rotalis Mohammad, 1970
- Prionospio rotunda Delgado-Blas, 2015
- Prionospio rugosa Sigvaldadóttir, 1997
- Prionospio runei Hylleberg & Nateewathana, 1991
- Prionospio saccifera Mackie & Hartley, 1990
- Prionospio saldanha Day, 1961
- Prionospio sandersi Maciolek, 1981
- Prionospio sanmartini Delgado-Blas, Díaz-Díaz & Viéitez, 2019
- Prionospio sexoculata Augener, 1918
- Prionospio sishaensis Wu & Chen, 1964
- Prionospio solisi Peixoto & Paiva, 2019
- Prionospio somaliensis Cognetti-Varriale, 1988
- Prionospio spongicola Wesenberg-Lund, 1958
- Prionospio steenstrupi Malmgren, 1867
- Prionospio tatura Wilson, 1990
- Prionospio tetelensis Gibbs, 1971
- Prionospio texana Hartman, 1951
- Prionospio thalanji Wilson & Humphreys, 2001
- Prionospio tridentata Blake & Kudenov, 1978
- Prionospio tripinnata Maciolek, 1985
- Prionospio unilamellata Sigvaldadóttir & Desbruyères, 2003
- Prionospio vallensis Neal & Paterson, 2016
- Prionospio variegata Imajima, 1990
- Prionospio vermillionensis Fauchald, 1972
- Prionospio wambiri Wilson, 1990
- Prionospio wireni Maciolek, 1985
- Prionospio yuriel Wilson, 1990
