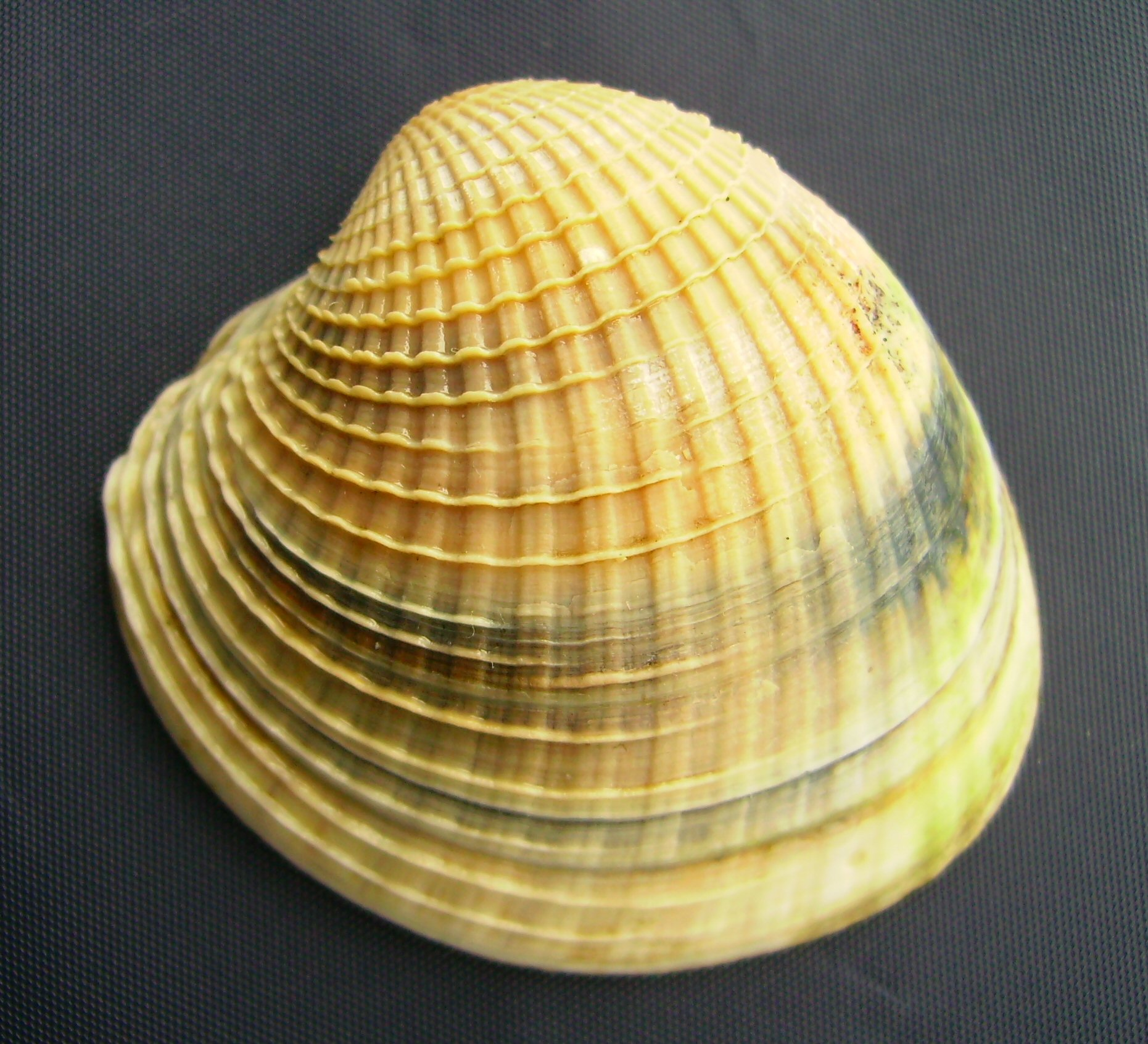
- External view of one valve of a shell of Austrovenus stutchburyi

Scientific classification
- Kingdom: Animalia
- Phylum: Mollusca
- Class: Bivalvia
- Order: Venerida
- Superfamily: Veneroidea
- Family: Veneridae
- Genus: Austrovenus; Finlay, 1927

Species
- See text.

= Austrovenus =

Austrovenus Temporal range: Middle Pliocene to Present

Genus of bivalves

Austrovenus is a genus of marine bivalve molluscs, in the family Veneridae. This genus is native to New Zealand.

== Species ==
Species in the genus Austrovenus include:

- Austrovenus northlandica Eagle, 2000 †
- Austrovenus stutchburyi (Wood, 1828) – New Zealand cockle, New Zealand little neck clam
- Austrovenus tamakiensis (Marwick, 1948) †
