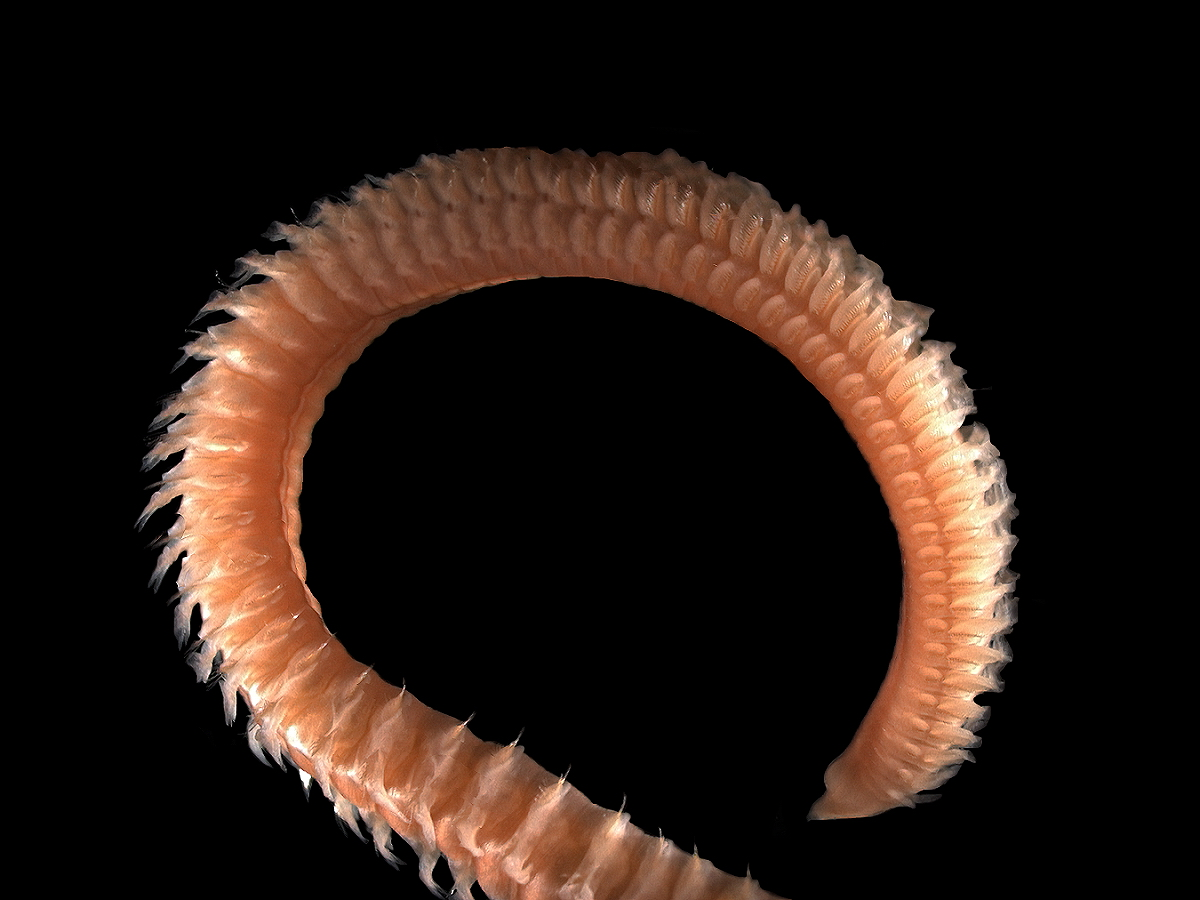

Scientific classification
- Kingdom: Animalia
- Phylum: Annelida
- Clade: Pleistoannelida
- Clade: Sedentaria
- Order: Spionida
- Family: Spionidae
- Genus: Scolelepis; Blainville, 1828

= Scolelepis =

Genus of annelid worms

Scolelepis is a genus of annelids belonging to the family Spionidae.

The genus has cosmopolitan distribution.

Species:

- Scolelepis acuta (Treadwell, 1914)
- Scolelepis agilis (Verrill, 1873)
- Scolelepis aitutakii Gibbs, 1972
- Scolelepis alaskensis (Treadwell, 1914)
- Scolelepis alisonae Williams, 2007
- Scolelepis anakenae Rozbaczylo & Castilla, 1988
- Scolelepis andradei Delgado-Blas, Diaz & Linero-Arana, 2010
- Scolelepis angulata Zhou, 2014
- Scolelepis antipoda (Augener, 1926)
- Scolelepis balihaiensis Hartmann-Schröder, 1979
- Scolelepis bifida Hutchings & Turvey, 1984
- Scolelepis blakei Hartmann-Schröder, 1980
- Scolelepis bonnieri (Mesnil, 1896)
- Scolelepis bousfieldi Pettibone, 1963
- Scolelepis branchia Imajima, 1992
- Scolelepis brevibranchia Hartmann-Schröder, 1991
- Scolelepis bullibranchia Rossi, 1982
- Scolelepis burkovskii Sikorski, 1994
- Scolelepis cantabra (Rioja, 1918)
- Scolelepis carrascoi Maciolek, 1987
- Scolelepis carunculata Blake & Kudenov, 1978
- Scolelepis chilensis (Hartmann-Schröder, 1962)
- Scolelepis cirratulus
- Scolelepis crenulata Hartmann-Schröder, 1991
- Scolelepis daphoinos Zhou, Ji & Li, 2009
- Scolelepis denmarkensis Hartmann-Schröder, 1983
- Scolelepis dicha Hutchings, Frouin & Hily, 1998
- Scolelepis edmondsi Hutchings & Turvey, 1984
- Scolelepis eltaninae Blake, 1983
- Scolelepis eltaninae Blake, 1983
- Scolelepis faughni (Gallardo, 1968)
- Scolelepis finmarchicus Sikorski & Pavlova, 2015
- Scolelepis foliosa (Audouin & Milne Edwards, 1833)
- Scolelepis foliosa (Audouin & Milne Edwards, 1833)
- Scolelepis fulginosa
- Scolelepis gaucha (Orensanz & Gianuca, 1974)
- Scolelepis geniculata Imajima, 1992
- Scolelepis gilchristi (Day, 1961)
- Scolelepis globosa Wu & Chen, 1964
- Scolelepis goodbodyi (Jones, 1962)
- Scolelepis hutchingsae Dauer, 1985
- Scolelepis inversa Meißner & Götting, 2015
- Scolelepis knightjonesi (Silva, 1961)
- Scolelepis korsuni Sikorski, 1994
- Scolelepis kudenovi Hartmann-Schröder, 1981
- Scolelepis laciniata Eibye-Jacobsen, 1997
- Scolelepis lamellata (McIntosh, 1909)
- Scolelepis lamellicincta Blake & Kudenov, 1978
- Scolelepis laonicola (Tzetlin, 1985)
- Scolelepis lefebvrei (Gravier, 1905)
- Scolelepis lighti Delgado-Blas, 2006
- Scolelepis lingulata Imajima, 1992
- Scolelepis longirostris (Quatrefages, 1843)
- Scolelepis maculata
- Scolelepis magnicornuta Williams, 2007
- Scolelepis magnus Ozolinsh, 1990
- Scolelepis marionis Branch, 1998
- Scolelepis melasma Hutchings, Frouin & Hily, 1998
- Scolelepis minuta (Treadwell, 1939)
- Scolelepis neglecta Surugiu, 2016
- Scolelepis occipitalis Blake & Kudenov, 1978
- Scolelepis oligobranchia (Chlebovitsch, 1959)
- Scolelepis papillosa (Okuda, 1937)
- Scolelepis perrieri (Fauvel, 1902)
- Scolelepis pettiboneae Maciolek, 1986
- Scolelepis phyllobranchia Blake & Kudenov, 1978
- Scolelepis planata Imajima, 1992
- Scolelepis precirriseta Blake & Kudenov, 1978
- Scolelepis quadridentata Maciolek, 1986
- Scolelepis quinquedentata (Hartmann-Schröder, 1965)
- Scolelepis sagittaria Imajima, 1992
- Scolelepis squamata (Muller, 1806)
- Scolelepis texana Foster, 1971
- Scolelepis towra Blake & Kudenov, 1978
- Scolelepis tridentata (Southern, 1914)
- Scolelepis variegata Imajima, 1992
- Scolelepis vazaha Eibye-Jacobsen & Soares, 2000
- Scolelepis victoriensis Blake & Kudenov, 1978
- Scolelepis villosivaina Williams, 2007
- Scolelepis viridis Blake & Kudenov, 1978
- Scolelepis vossae Delgado-Blas, 2006
- Scolelepis vulgaris (Johnston, 1827)
- Scolelepis westoni Maciolek, 1986
- Scolelepis williami (de Silva, 1961)
- Scolelepis yamaguchii (Imajima, 1959)
