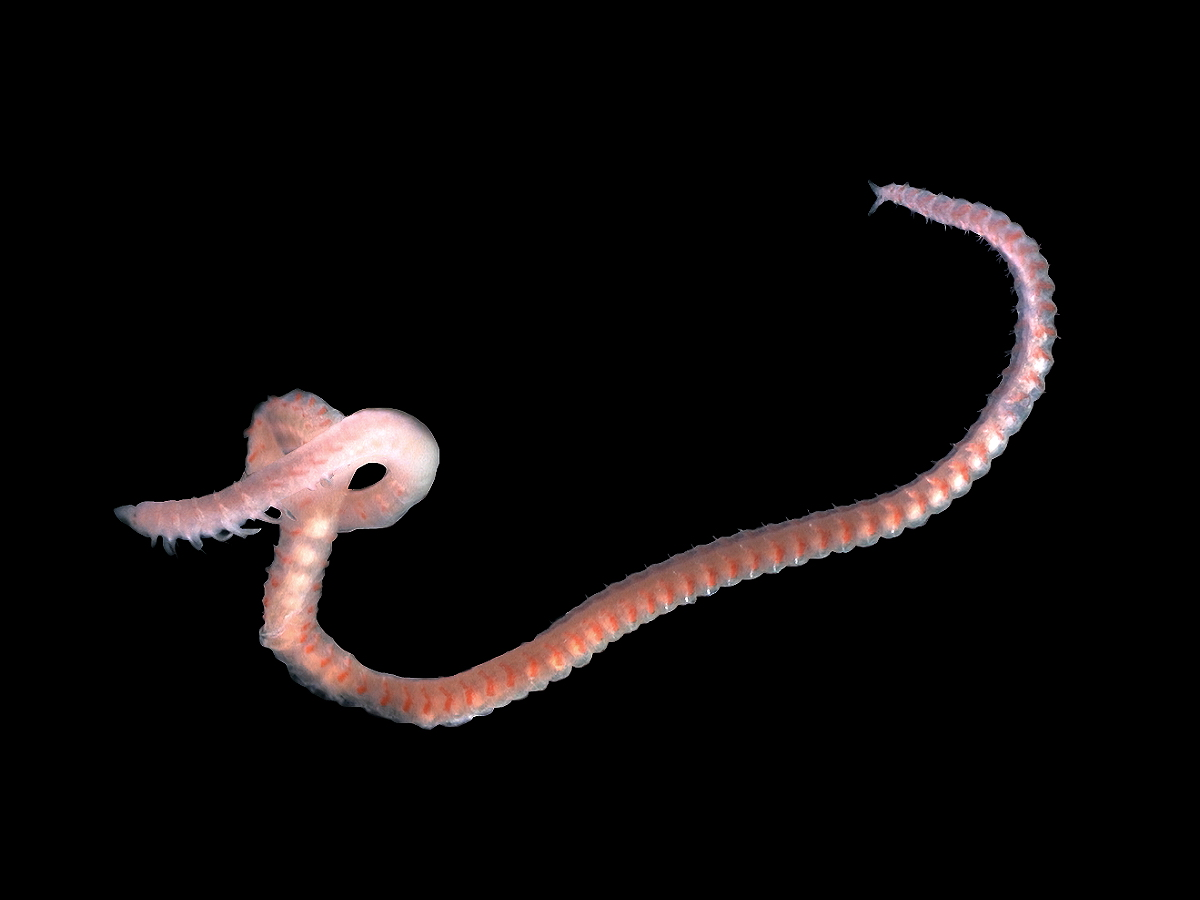
- Aonides.jpg

Scientific classification
- Kingdom: Animalia
- Phylum: Annelida
- Clade: Pleistoannelida
- Clade: Sedentaria
- Order: Spionida
- Family: Spionidae
- Genus: Aonides; Claparède, 1864

= Aonides =

Genus of segmented worms

Aonides is a genus of annelids belonging to the family Spionidae.

The genus has cosmopolitan distribution.

Species:

- Aonides californiensis Rioja, 1947
- Aonides glandulosa Blake, 1996
- Aonides mayaguezensis Foster, 1969
- Aonides nodosetosa Storch, 1966
- Aonides orensanzi Radashevsky, 2015
- Aonides oxycephala (Sars, 1862)
- Aonides paucibranchiata Southern, 1914
- Aonides selvagensis Brito, Nunez & Riera, 2006
- Aonides trifida Estcourt, 1967
