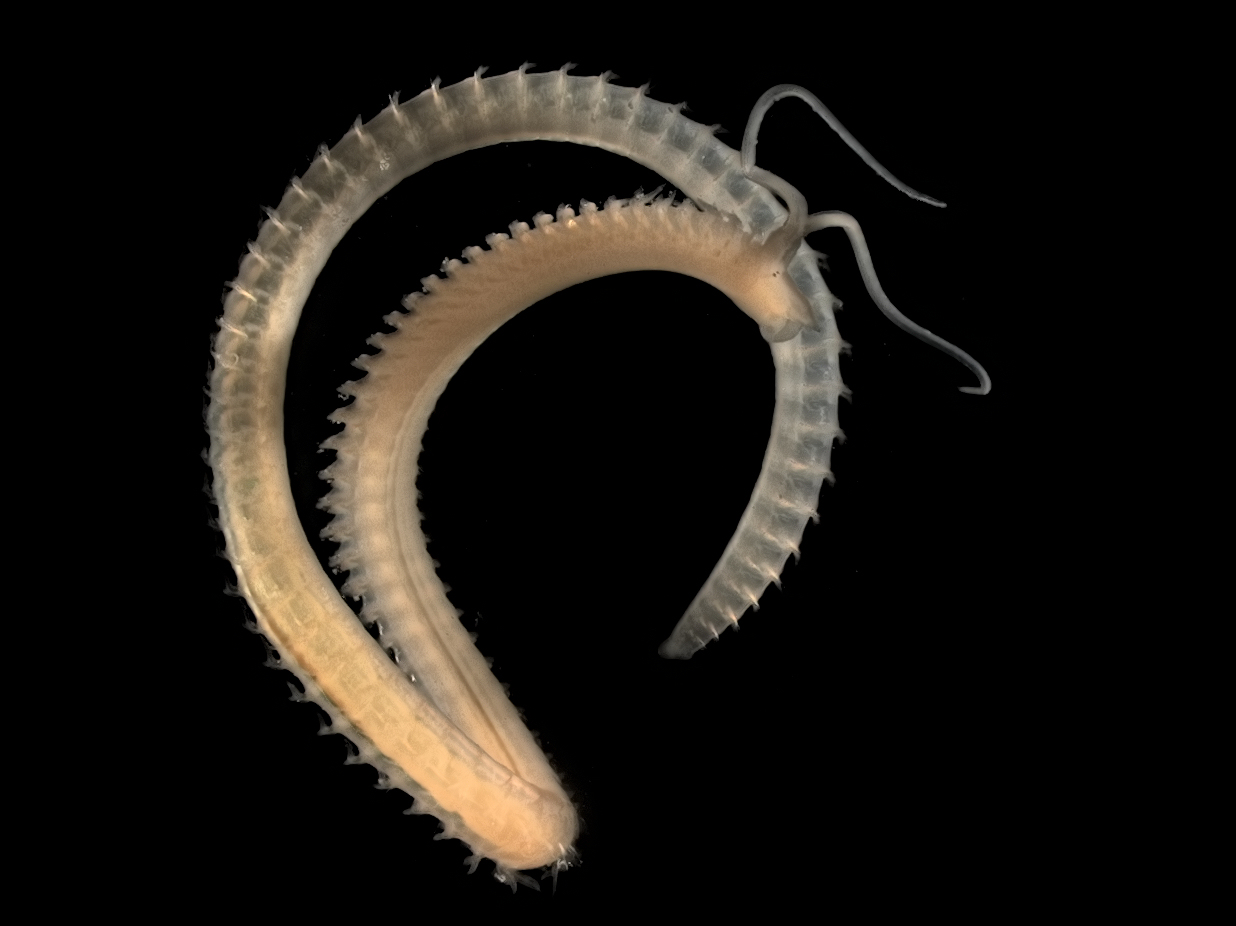

Scientific classification
- Kingdom: Animalia
- Phylum: Annelida
- Clade: Pleistoannelida
- Clade: Sedentaria
- Order: Spionida
- Family: Spionidae
- Genus: Scolelepis
- Species: S. squamata

Binomial name
- Scolelepis squamata (Abildgaard, in O. F. Müller, 1806)

Synonyms
- Lumbricus cirratulus Delle Chiaje, 1831; Lumbricus squamatus Müller, 1806; Nereis foliata Dalyell, 1853; Nerine capensis McIntosh, 1924; Nerine cirratulus (Delle Chiaje, 1831); Nerine cirratulus hirsuta (Treadwell, 1928); Nerine heteropoda Webster, 1879; Nerine mesnili Bellan & Lagardère, 1971; Scolelepis mesnili (Bellan & Lagardère, 1971); Scolelepis squamata (Müller, 1806); Spio hirsuta Treadwell, 1928

= Scolelepis squamata =

Species of annelid worm

Scolelepis squamata is a species of polychaete worm in the family Spionidae. It occurs on the lower shore of coasts on either side of the Atlantic Ocean.

== Description ==
Scolelepis squamata is a slender, bluish-green worm with a maximum length of about 14 cm (5.5 in) and over two hundred segments when fully grown. The prostomium (head) is diamond-shaped and has four eyes, arranged in a trapezoid fashion, two long slender palps, and no central antenna. Each segment has a pair of parapodia with chaeta (bristles). The dorsal lobes of the parapodia are long and thin and are fused to the gills for half their length. The ventral lobes are rounded and short, and slightly bilobed from segment 20 onwards. There are gills (red) on all segments except segment 2 and the last seven body segments.

== Distribution and habitat ==
Scolelepis squamata is found on both sides of the Atlantic Ocean, as well as in the Mediterranean Sea, the Caribbean Sea and the Gulf of Mexico. It digs a burrow in the sediment in the lower parts of the shore and the shallow sublittoral zone. Typically it chooses sandy beaches in the intertidal zone and sandy and silty sediments in subtidal flats. It tolerates low salinity levels and is often found in estuaries.

== Biology ==
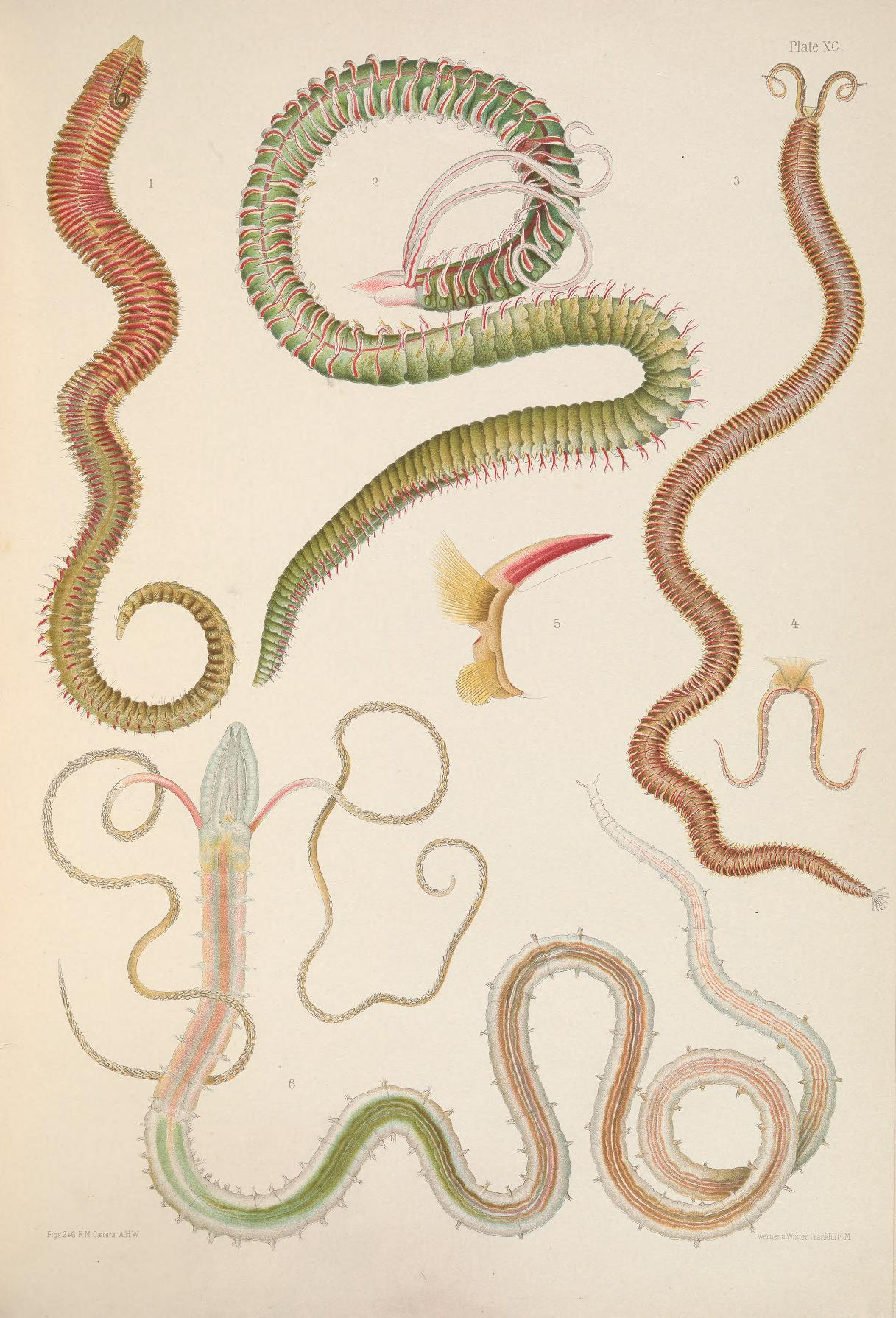
S. squamata (top centre), published in A monograph of the British marine annelids 1915.

Scolelepis squamata lives in a mucus-reinforced, vertical burrow in the sediment. It uses the long palps to feed on organic particles on the nearby seabed. The palps do not have a ciliated groove, so the particles are brought to the pharynx by a contraction of the whole palp. If there is a current, each palp can be coiled up in a helix, and the animal can feed entirely on suspended particles. Examination of the contents of the gut showed sediment particles, faecal pellets of other animals and a variety of embryos, larvae and juvenile prey.

On the south coast of Britain, this worm breeds between March and July; sperm and eggs are released into the sea where fertilisation takes place, and the larvae are planktonic for about five weeks before settling on the seabed and developing into juvenile worms. In Brazil, it is one of the commonest species of worm on some intertidal beaches. Here it breeds all year round, with peak recruitment of juveniles in April and October. This worm has a short life-span and seems to have adopted a strategy of high growth rate, high reproductive effort and opportunistic behaviour.
