= Dipolydora =

Scientific classification
- Kingdom: Animalia
- Phylum: Annelida
- Clade: Pleistoannelida
- Clade: Sedentaria
- Order: Spionida
- Family: Spionidae
- Genus: Dipolydora; Verrill, 1881

Genus of annelid worms

Dipolydora is a genus of polychaetes belonging to the family Spionidae.

The genus has cosmopolitan distribution.

Species:

- Dipolydora aciculata (Blake & Kudenov, 1978)
- Dipolydora akaina Blake, 1996
- Dipolydora alborectalis (Radashevsky, 1993)
- Dipolydora anatentaculata Delgado-Blas, 2008
- Dipolydora antonbruunae (Blake, 1983)
- Dipolydora armata (Langerhans, 1880)
- Dipolydora barbilla (Blake, 1981)
- Dipolydora bidentata (Zachs, 1933)
- Dipolydora bifurcata (Blake, 1981)
- Dipolydora blakei (Maciolek, 1984)
- Dipolydora capensis (Day, 1955)
- Dipolydora cardalia (Berkeley, 1927)
- Dipolydora carunculata (Radashevsky, 1993)
- Dipolydora caulleryi (Mesnil, 1897)
- Dipolydora coeca (Örsted, 1843)
- Dipolydora commensalis (Andrews, 1891)
- Dipolydora concharum (Verrill, 1880)
- Dipolydora contoyensis Delgado-Blas, 2008
- Dipolydora elegantissima (Blake & Woodwick, 1972)
- Dipolydora flava (Claparède, 1870)
- Dipolydora giardi (Mesnil, 1893)
- Dipolydora goreensis (Augener, 1918)
- Dipolydora hartmanae (Blake, 1971)
- Dipolydora huelma Sato-Okoshi & Takatsuka, 2001
- Dipolydora langerhansi (Mesnil, 1896)
- Dipolydora magellanica (Blake, 1983)
- Dipolydora melanopalpa Manchenko & Radashevsky, 2002
- Dipolydora normalis (Day, 1957)
- Dipolydora notialis (Blake & Kudenov, 1978)
- Dipolydora paracaulleryi Meißner, Bick, Guggolz & Götting, 2014
- Dipolydora peristomialis (Hartman, 1976)
- Dipolydora pilikia (Ward, 1981)
- Dipolydora pilocollaris (Blake & Kudenov, 1978)
- Dipolydora protuberata (Blake & Kudenov, 1978)
- Dipolydora quadrilobata (Jacobi, 1883)
- Dipolydora saintjosephi (Eliason, 1920)
- Dipolydora socialis (Schmarda, 1861)
- Dipolydora tentaculata (Blake & Kudenov, 1978)
- Dipolydora tetrabranchia (Hartman, 1945)
- Dipolydora tridenticulata (Woodwick, 1964)
- Dipolydora trilobata (Radashevsky, 1993)
- Dipolydora vulcanica (Radashevsky, 1994)
