= Austrovenus northlandica =

Scientific classification
- Kingdom: Animalia
- Phylum: Mollusca
- Class: Bivalvia
- Order: Venerida
- Family: Veneridae
- Genus: Austrovenus
- Species: †A. northlandica

Binomial name
- †Austrovenus northlandica Eagle, 2000

Extinct species of marine bivalve

Austrovenus northlandica is an extinct species of marine bivalve that belongs to the family Veneridae (Venus clams). This species lived in Auckland, New Zealand during the Early Miocene epoch.

This species was described in the year 2000 by Michael K. Eagle (M. K. Eagle), a paleontologist from New Zealand.
