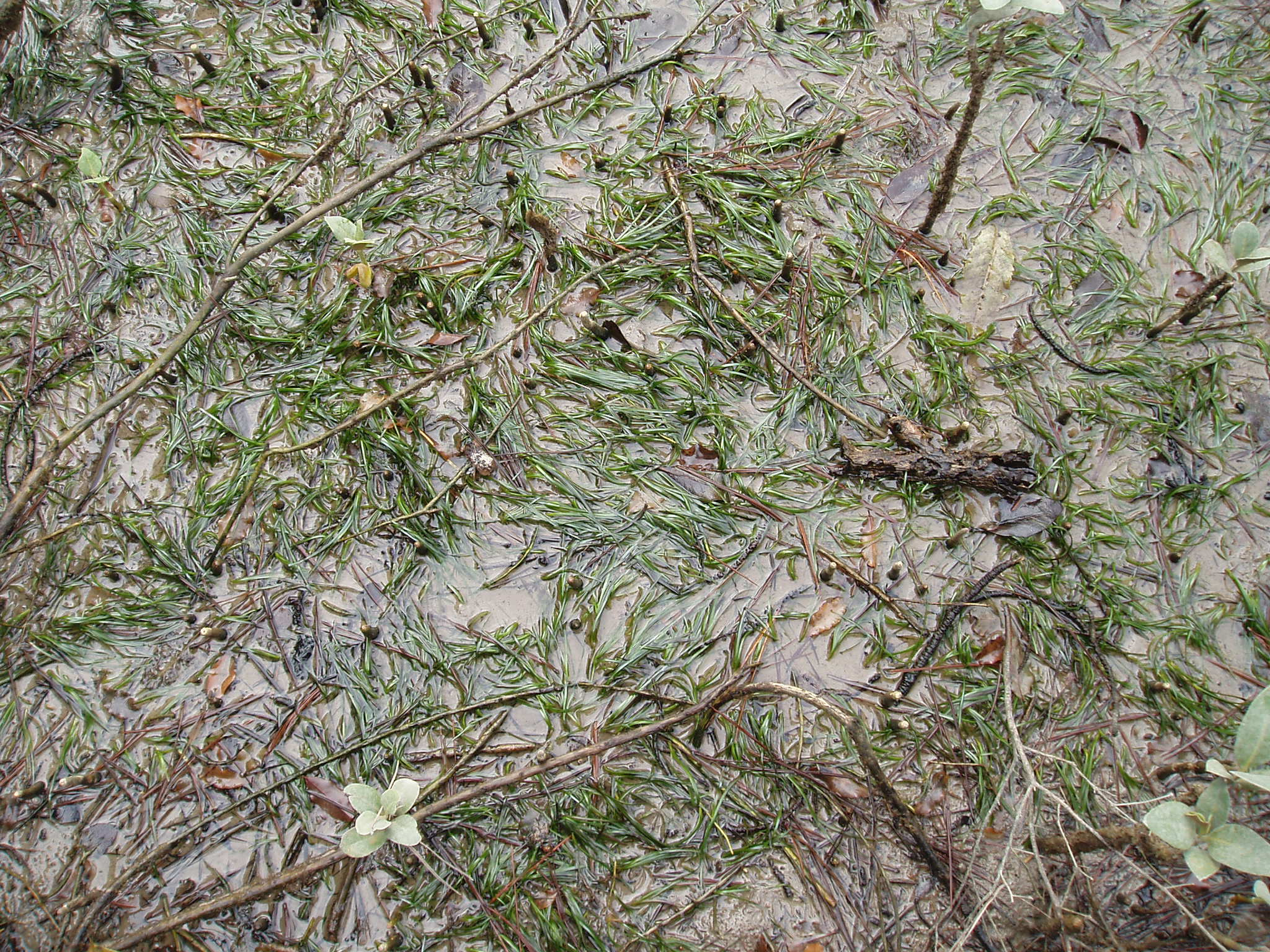

Conservation status
- Least Concern (IUCN 3.1)

Scientific classification
- Kingdom: Plantae
- Clade: Embryophytes
- Clade: Tracheophytes
- Clade: Angiosperms
- Clade: Monocots
- Order: Alismatales
- Family: Zosteraceae
- Genus: Zostera
- Species: Z. muelleri

Binomial name
- Zostera muelleri Irmisch ex Asch.

Synonyms
- Nanozostera capricorni (Asch.) Toml. & Posl.

= Zostera muelleri =

Species of plant in the family Zosteraceae

Zostera muelleri is a southern hemisphere temperate species of seagrass native to the seacoasts of South Australia, Victoria and Tasmania and New Zealand. Today, Zostera muelleri can be found in regions of Australia, New Zealand, and Papua New Guinea, as well as areas of the eastern Indian Ocean, and the southwest and western central Pacific Ocean. Zostera muelleri is a marine angiosperm, and is commonly referred to as eelgrass or garweed. It is a fast growing and readily colonizing species that serves as a feeding ground for wading birds and aquatic animals, and a breeding ground for juvenile fish and shrimp species.

Seagrasses are a flowering plant species, not to be confused with seaweed, which do not form flowers, fruits, and seeds to reproduce. Seagrasses are important to the marine ecosystem for many reasons. For one, they provide food, homes, and breeding grounds to a variety of marine species. Secondly, meadows of seagrass are important carbon reservoirs or sinks, sequestering 10–18% of the ocean's carbon accumulation for long-term storage. Seagrasses also enhance sediment accretion, and protect coastlines from destructive wave energy.

== Taxonomy ==
Zostera muelleri belongs to the order Alismatales. There are approximately 72 species of seagrasses. There are three families of seagrasses, Zosteraceae, Hydrocharitaceae, and Cymodoceaceae. There is some taxonomic uncertainty with this species. Zostera muelleri is synonymous with Z. mucronata, Z. capricorni, and Z. novazelandica, which were once separate species, but since then molecular and morphological studies have confirmed that they are members of the same species. In 2006, Jacobs et al. (2006) suggested the final name of the species be Z. muelleri. Zostera muelleri has three subspecies, Z. muelleri subsp. capricorni, Z. muelleri subsp. mucronata, and Z. muelleri subsp. muelleri.

== Habitat and geographic range ==
Zostera muelleri is a perennial species, meaning populations of it endure year round. They are mostly found in places such as littoral or sublittoral sand flats, sheltered coastal embayments, soft, muddy, sandy areas near a reef, estuaries, shallow bays, and in intertidal shoals. They aren't common on reefs because there is little space and nutrients for them to grow there. Zostera muelleri is a marine species, but it can tolerate some freshwater inputs. It mostly occurs in mono-specific meadows, but it can grow alongside Ruppia, Halophila, and Lepilena. Zostera muelleri is widespread in Southern Australia, and its also found in New Zealand and Papua New Guinea.

== Morphology ==
This species has long strap-shaped leaves, rounded leaf tips and thin rhizomes that are <3 mm in diameter. There are visible cross-veins in the leaf. The rhizomes are either dark brown or yellow. Young rhizomes are typically yellow, but the leaves of this plant can turn red if they're under high sunlight. Because of its phenotype, Z. muelleri can be confused with Z. tasmanica and Z. capensis. The leaf width morphology is variable, so Z. muelleri with thin leaves can sometimes also be confused with H. uninervus.

== Adaptations to marine life ==
The species Z. muelleri evolved from terrestrial plants, but adapted to marine life around 140 million years ago during the Cretaceous period. In order to adapt to life in the ocean, the Z. muelleri genome lost/modified several genes which had once helped them survive on land, such as genes for hormone biosynthesis and signaling and cell wall catabolism. Some of the genes that were lost include genes associated with ethylene synthesis and signaling pathways, as well as genes involved in pectin catabolism. Additionally, genes for stomatal differentiation, terpenoid synthesis, and ultraviolet resistance were lost. The genes responsible for salinity tolerance and stress-resistance remain in the genome.

== Reproduction ==
Seagrasses are flowering species, but they can reproduce both sexually and asexually. Reproducing sexually increases genetic variation, which can enhance a plant's ability to adapt to a changing environment, but asexual reproduction requires less effort and is what Z. muelleri typically uses to maintain its population. When reproducing sexually, the plant's flowers form an inflorescence that is enclosed in a spathe (a large sheathing bract that encloses flower clusters in certain plant species). Each shoot can have up to 6 spathes, which contain 4–12 pairs of male and female flowers. Larger plants will have more flowers. Male flowers typically mature before female flowers. Once a flowering shoot matures, it darkens and breaks off the plant, and floats away. The enclosed seeds then become deposited in sediment someplace else. Zostera muelleri can reproduce asexually via rhizome encroachment, which is a form clonal reproduction. The plant can use this form of regeneration to recover from high intensity disturbances.

== Threats and losses ==
Threats to this species include coastal development, eutrophication, boat mooring, dredging, agricultural/urban runoff, and sedimentation. Meadows of Z. muelleri have been lost in areas of Port Phillip Bay and New Zealand due to habitat disturbance, sedimentation, and turbidity. During the 1960s, meadows of Z. muelleri in New Zealand were affected by a wasting disease. Because it is less tolerant of heat than other tropical species, climate change may be a threat to meadows of this species in tropical regions.

== Conservation ==
There are currently no conservation measures for this species.
