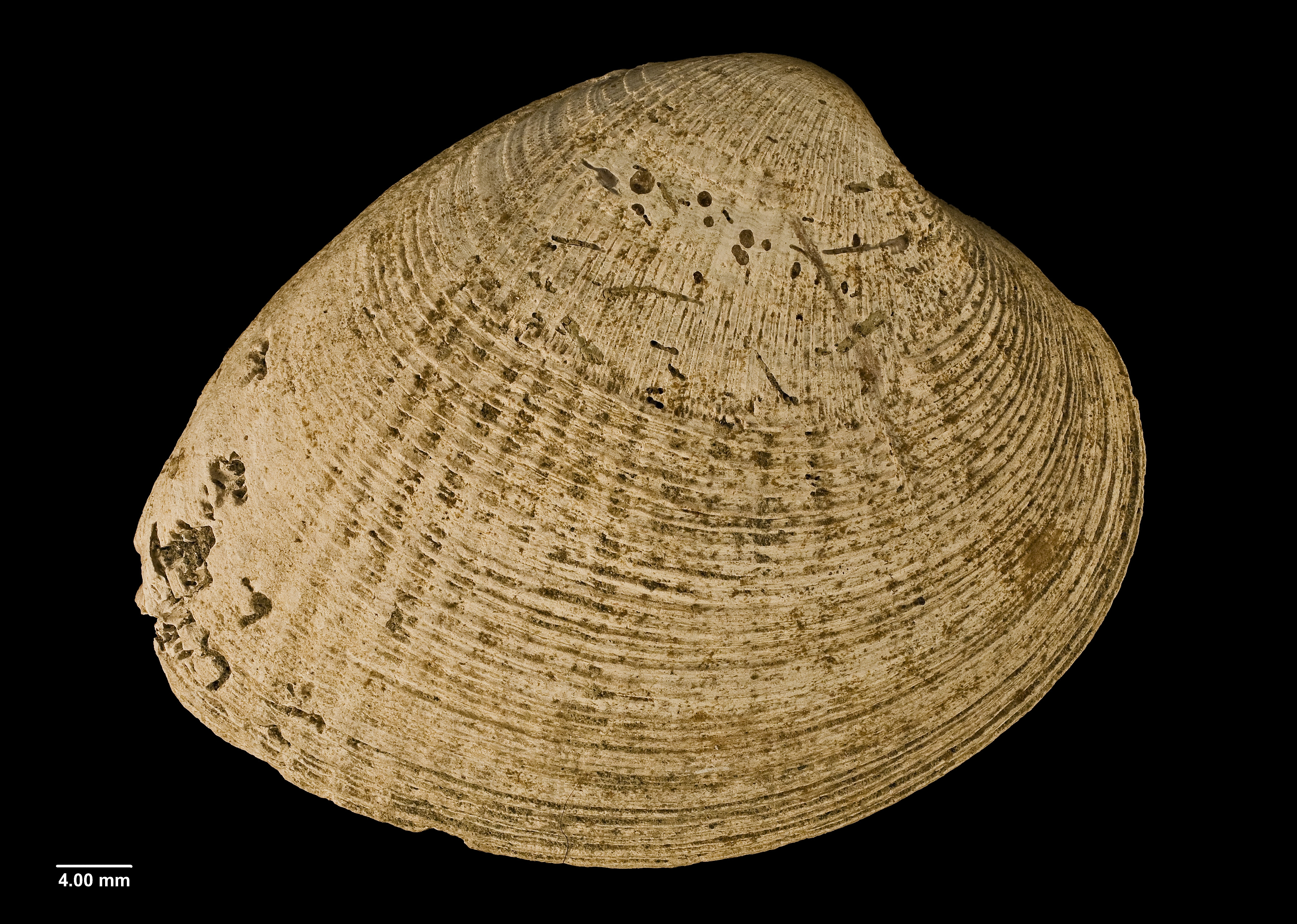

Scientific classification
- Kingdom: Animalia
- Phylum: Mollusca
- Class: Bivalvia
- Order: Venerida
- Family: Veneridae
- Genus: Austrovenus
- Species: †A. tamakiensis

Binomial name
- †Austrovenus tamakiensis (Marwick, 1948)

= Austrovenus tamakiensis =

Extinct species of marine bivalve

Austrovenus tamakiensis is an extinct species of marine bivalve that belongs to the Venus clam family Veneridae. It lived in Otahuhu, New Zealand during the lower Pliocene epoch.
