= Fabricia =

Fabricia may refer to:

- Fabricia (annelid), a genus of polychaetes in the family Fabriciidae
- Fabricia gens, an ancient Roman family
- Fabricia Adans., a synonym of the plant genus Lavandula (lavender)
- Fabricia Scop., a synonym of the plant genus Alysicarpus (moneywort)

== See also ==
- Fabriciidae, a family of annelid worm
- Fabricio (disambiguation)
- Fabricius, a surname
