= Fabrice =

- Gender: Masculine

Other names
- Related names: Fabrício (Spanish), Fabrizio (Italian)

Fabrice is a French masculine given name from the Roman name Fabricius, which is itself derived from the Latin faber meaning blacksmith or craftsman. Notable people with the name include:

- Fabrice Balanche (born 1969), French geographer
- Fabrice Barusseau (born 1970), French politician
- Fabrice Bellard, French computer programmer who founded FFmpeg
- Fabrice Bethuel (born 1963), French mathematician
- Fabrice Bollon (born 1965), French conductor and composer
- Fabrice Brun (born 1968), French politician
- Fabrice Burgaud (born 1971), French magistrate
- Fabrice Caietain (fl. 1570-1578), Italian singer, songwriter and song publisher
- Fabrice Calmels (born 1980), French ballet dancer and model
- Fabrice Carré (1855–1921), French playwright, and librettist
- Fabrice Colin (born 1972), French writer
- Fabrice David, Mauritian politician
- Fabrice Desvignes (born 1973), French chef
- Fabrice Du Welz (born 1972), Belgian film director
- Fabrice Fries (born 1960), French businessman
- Fabrice Hadjadj (born 1971), French writer and philosopher
- Fabrice Hybert (born 1961), French plastic artist
- Fabrice Joubert, French film director, animator, story artist, and producer
- Fabrice Labrousse (1806–1876), French playwright
- Fabrice Lambot, French film director and producer
- Fabrice Langlade, (born 1964), French sculptor
- Fabrice Lhomme (born 1965), French investigative journalist
- Fabrice Lig (born 1972), Belgium techno music producer
- Fabrice Luchini (born 1951), French actor
- Fabrice Millischer (born 1985), French trombonist, sackbutist and cellist
- Fabrice Morvan (born 1966), French singer
- Fabrice Pothier (born 1975), French political expert and CEO
- Fabrice Roussel (born 1973), French politician
- Fabrice Simon (1951–1998), Haitian-American fashion designer
- Fabrice Soulier (born 1969), French professional poker player
- Fabrice Ziolkowski (born 1954), French screenwriter

== Sportspeople ==
- Fabrice Abriel (born 1979), French football manager and player
- Fabrice Amedeo (born 1978), French sailor and journalist
- Fabrice Apruzesse (born 1985), French footballer
- Fabrice Asencio (1966–2016), French footballer
- Fabrice Aurieng (born 1981), French kickboxer
- Fabrice Becker (born 1971), French former freestyle skier
- Fabrice Benichou (born 1965), French boxer
- Fabrice Bry (born 1972), French volleyball player
- Fabrice Dabla (born 1992), Togolese sprinter
- Fabrice Divert (born 1967), French footballer
- Fabrice Ehret (born 1979), Swiss-born French footballer
- Fabrice Fernandes (born 1979), French footballer
- Fabrice Fiorèse (born 1975), French footballer
- Fabrice Fokobo (born 1994), Cameroonian footballer
- Fabrice Gatambiye (born 2000), Finnish footballer
- Fabrice Gautrat (born 1987), American soccer player and coach
- Fabrice Grange (born 1971), French footballer
- Fabrice Guy (born 1968), French Nordic combined skier
- Fabrice Guzel (born 1990), French footballer
- Fabrice Hartmann (born 2001), German footballer
- Fabrice Lapierre (born 1983), Mauritian-born Australian long jumper
- Fabrice Lassonde (born 1989), Canadian soccer player
- Fabrice Levrat (born 1979), French footballer
- Fabrice Lokembo-Lokaso (born 1982), Congolese footballer
- Fabrice Martin (born 1986), French tennis player
- Fabrice Metz (born 1991), French rugby player
- Fabrice Moreau (born 1967), French-Cameroonian footballer
- Fabrice Moreau (born 1978), French rower
- Fabrice Muamba (born 1988), Congolese-British footballer
- Fabrice Ngah (born 1997), Cameroonian footballer
- Fabrice Ngoma (born 1994), Congolese footballer
- Fabrice Nsakala (born 1990), French footballer
- Fabrice Noël (born 1985), Haitian footballer
- Fabrice Olinga (born 1996), Cameroonian footballer
- Fabrice Ondoa (born 1995), Cameroonian footballer
- Fabrice Pithia (born 1987), Mauritian footballer
- Fabrice Reuperné (born 1975), Martiniquais footballer
- Fabrice Salanson (1979–2003), French road cyclist
- Fabrice Santoro (born 1972), French tennis player
- Fabrice Seidou (born 1986), Ivorian footballer
- Fabrice Tiozzo (born 1969), French boxer
- Fabrice Vandeputte (born 1969), French football manager and player

== See also ==
- Fabrice Dubois, a fictitious identity of Nemesis in Nemesis: Reloaded
