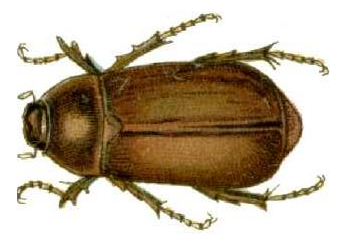

Scientific classification
- Kingdom: Animalia
- Phylum: Arthropoda
- Clade: Pancrustacea
- Class: Insecta
- Order: Coleoptera
- Suborder: Polyphaga
- Infraorder: Scarabaeiformia
- Family: Scarabaeidae
- Genus: Lepidiota
- Species: L. consobrina

Binomial name
- Lepidiota consobrina Girault, 1918

= Lepidiota consobrina =

Species of beetle

Lepidiota consobrina, the consobrina cane grub, is a beetle of the family Scarabaeidae. It is a pest of sugarcane, and occurs from Mossman to Gordonvale (Queensland, Australia), changing from a one-year lifecycle south of Cairns to a two-year lifecycle further north.

== Description ==
Adults reach a length of about 25–29 mm (0.98–1.14 in). They are very similar to Lepidiota negatoria, but may be distinguished by the unpunctured median longitudinal stripe on the pronotum, the narrow elytral intervals and the shape of the aedeagus.
