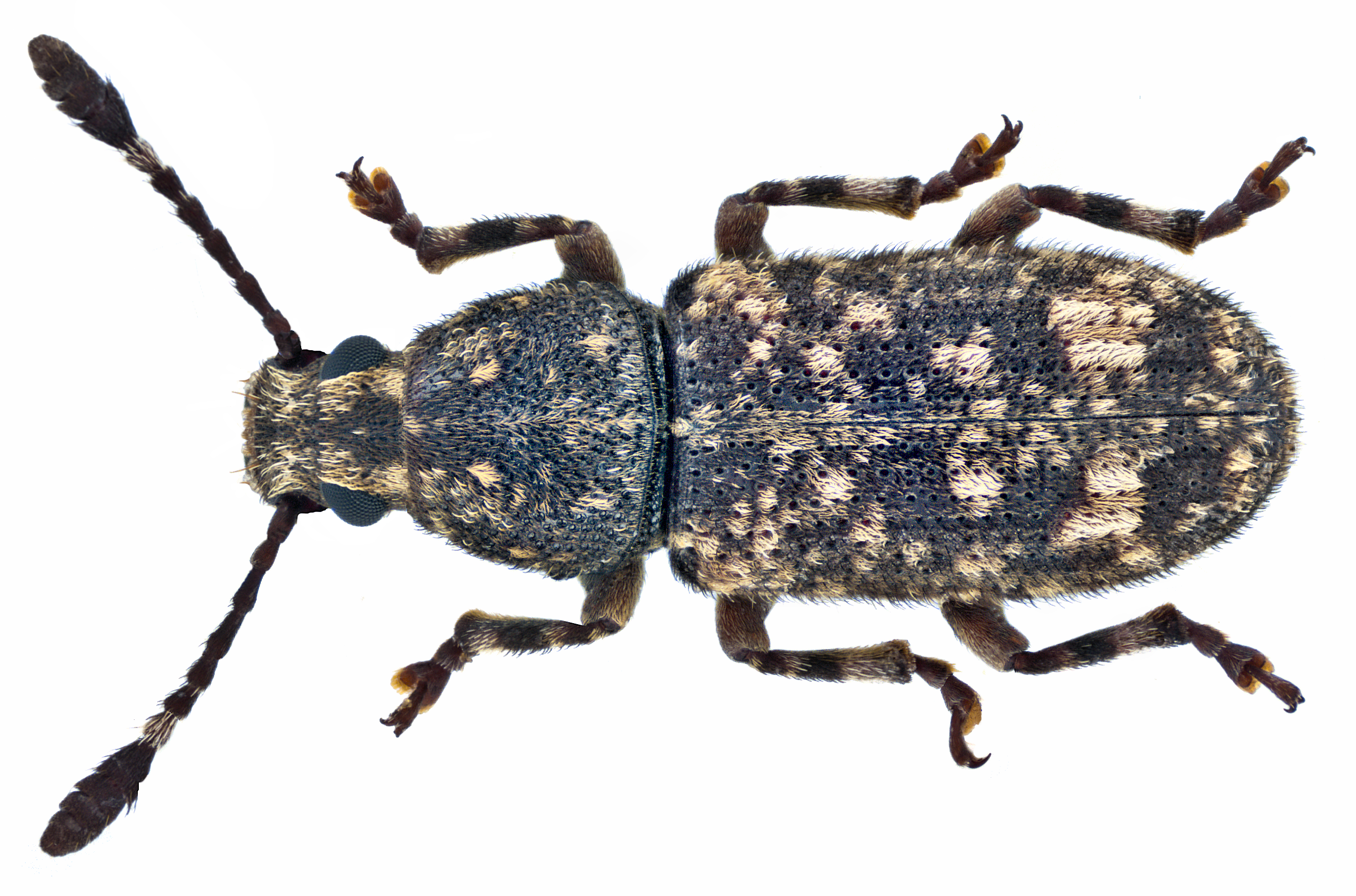
- Eucorynus crassicornis

Scientific classification
- Kingdom: Animalia
- Phylum: Arthropoda
- Clade: Pancrustacea
- Class: Insecta
- Order: Coleoptera
- Suborder: Polyphaga
- Infraorder: Cucujiformia
- Family: Anthribidae
- Genus: Eucorynus; Schoenherr, 1823

Type species
- Eucorynus crassicornis (Fabricius, 1801)

= Eucorynus =

Genus of beetles

Eucorynus is a genus of fungus weevils in the beetle family Anthribidae. The genus was first described in 1823 by Carl Johan Schoenherr. The type species of the genus is Anthribus crassicornis Fabricius, 1801.

The following species are listed as accepted by GBIF:

- Eucorynus crassicornis (J.C.Fabricius, 1802)
- Eucorynus flavescens Nakane, 1963
- Eucorynus marmoratus Montrouzier, 1857
- Eucorynus mastersi Blackburn, 1900
- Eucorynus porcellus CJ.Schönherr, 1832
- Eucorynus setosulus Pascoe, 1859
- Eucorynus stevensi Pascoe, 1859
- Eucorynus unicolor Jordan, 1904
