= Lepidiota argentea =

Scientific classification
- Kingdom: Animalia
- Phylum: Arthropoda
- Clade: Pancrustacea
- Class: Insecta
- Order: Coleoptera
- Suborder: Polyphaga
- Infraorder: Scarabaeiformia
- Family: Scarabaeidae
- Genus: Lepidiota
- Species: L. argentea

Binomial name
- Lepidiota argentea Britton, 1978

Species of beetle

Lepidiota argentea is a species of beetle of the family Scarabaeidae. It is found in Australia (Cape York Peninsula, Queensland).

== Description ==
Adults reach a length of about 23 mm (0.91 in). They are very similar to Lepidiota perkinsi, but may be distinguished by the form of the aedeagus.
