= Lepidiota gibbifrons =

Scientific classification
- Kingdom: Animalia
- Phylum: Arthropoda
- Clade: Pancrustacea
- Class: Insecta
- Order: Coleoptera
- Suborder: Polyphaga
- Infraorder: Scarabaeiformia
- Family: Scarabaeidae
- Genus: Lepidiota
- Species: L. gibbifrons

Binomial name
- Lepidiota gibbifrons Britton, 1978

Species of beetle

Lepidiota gibbifrons is a species of beetle of the family Scarabaeidae. It is found in Australia (Queensland).

== Description ==
Adults reach a length of about 23–28 mm (0.91–1.10 in). They are very similar to Lepidiota caudata, but may be distinguished by the shape and denser punctuation of the clypeus, as well as the form of the aedeagus.
