= Lepidiota condita =

Scientific classification
- Kingdom: Animalia
- Phylum: Arthropoda
- Clade: Pancrustacea
- Class: Insecta
- Order: Coleoptera
- Suborder: Polyphaga
- Infraorder: Scarabaeiformia
- Family: Scarabaeidae
- Genus: Lepidiota
- Species: L. condita

Binomial name
- Lepidiota condita Britton, 1978

Species of beetle

Lepidiota condita is a species of beetle of the family Scarabaeidae. It is found in Australia (Northern Territory).

== Description ==
Adults reach a length of about 23 mm (0.91 in). They are similar to Lepidiota cabala, but may be distinguished by the density of the scales on the ventrites, as well as by the shape of the aedeagus.
