= Lepidiota uptoni =

Scientific classification
- Kingdom: Animalia
- Phylum: Arthropoda
- Clade: Pancrustacea
- Class: Insecta
- Order: Coleoptera
- Suborder: Polyphaga
- Infraorder: Scarabaeiformia
- Family: Scarabaeidae
- Genus: Lepidiota
- Species: L. uptoni

Binomial name
- Lepidiota uptoni Britton, 1978

Species of beetle

Lepidiota uptoni is a species of beetle of the family Scarabaeidae. It is found in Australia (Northern Territory).

== Description ==
Adults reach a length of about 15–17 mm (0.59–0.67 in). They are similar to Lepidiota clypealis, but may be distinguished by the shape of the clypeus. Furthermore, the pronotum is densely punctured only towards the margins.
