= Lepidiota flavipennis =

Scientific classification
- Kingdom: Animalia
- Phylum: Arthropoda
- Clade: Pancrustacea
- Class: Insecta
- Order: Coleoptera
- Suborder: Polyphaga
- Infraorder: Scarabaeiformia
- Family: Scarabaeidae
- Genus: Lepidiota
- Species: L. flavipennis

Binomial name
- Lepidiota flavipennis Lea, 1926

Species of beetle

Lepidiota flavipennis is a species of beetle of the family Scarabaeidae. It is found in Australia (Northern Territory).

== Description ==
Adults reach a length of about 17–21 mm (0.67–0.83 in). They are similar to Lepidiota aenigma, but may be distinguished by the shape of the clypeus, the absence of scales and punctures on parts of the pronotum and by the form of the aedeagus.
