= Lepidiota hilli =

Scientific classification
- Kingdom: Animalia
- Phylum: Arthropoda
- Clade: Pancrustacea
- Class: Insecta
- Order: Coleoptera
- Suborder: Polyphaga
- Infraorder: Scarabaeiformia
- Family: Scarabaeidae
- Genus: Lepidiota
- Species: L. hilli

Binomial name
- Lepidiota hilli Britton, 1978

Species of beetle

Lepidiota hilli is a species of beetle of the family Scarabaeidae. It is found in Australia (northern Northern Territory).

== Description ==
Adults reach a length of about 15 mm (0.59 in). They are very similar to Lepidiota lepidosterna, but may be distinguished by the shorter lamellae of the antennal club of the males and the form of the aedeagus.
