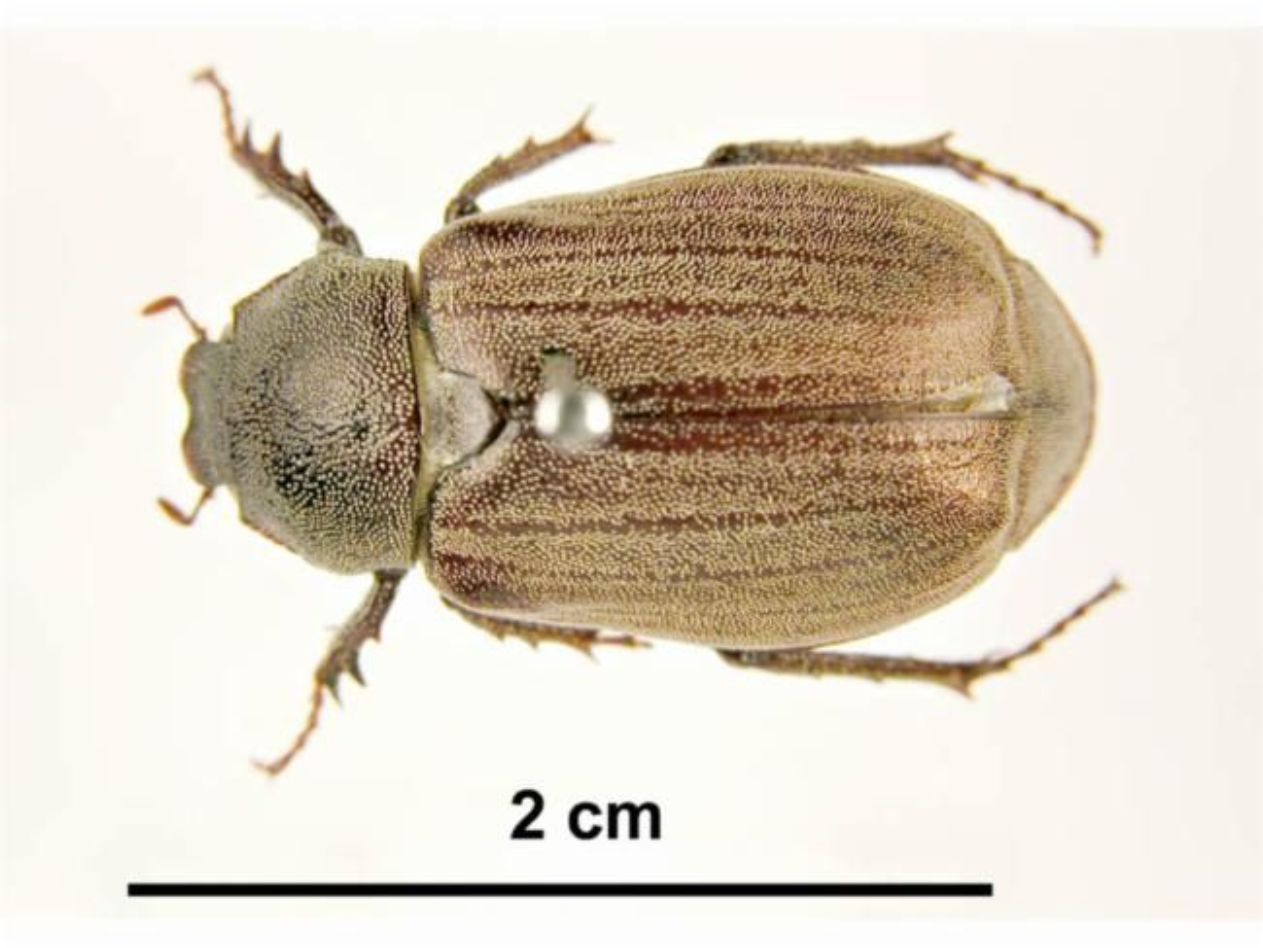

Scientific classification
- Kingdom: Animalia
- Phylum: Arthropoda
- Clade: Pancrustacea
- Class: Insecta
- Order: Coleoptera
- Suborder: Polyphaga
- Infraorder: Scarabaeiformia
- Family: Scarabaeidae
- Genus: Lepidiota
- Species: L. grata

Binomial name
- Lepidiota grata Blackburn, 1890

= Lepidiota grata =

Species of beetle

Lepidiota grata is a species of beetle of the family Scarabaeidae. It is found in Australia (coastal Queensland).

== Description ==
Adults reach a length of about 18–22 mm (0.71–0.87 in). They are very similar to Lepidiota rubrior, but may be distinguished by the shape of the clypeus and the shape of the aedeagus.
