= Fabrício Carvalho =

Fabrício Carvalho may refer to:

- Fabrício Carvalho (footballer, born January 1978), Fabrício Carvalho Pereira, Brazilian football midfielder
- Fabrício Carvalho (footballer, born February 1978), Fabrício de Carvalho Silva, Brazilian football forward

== See also ==
- Fabrício
- Carvalho
