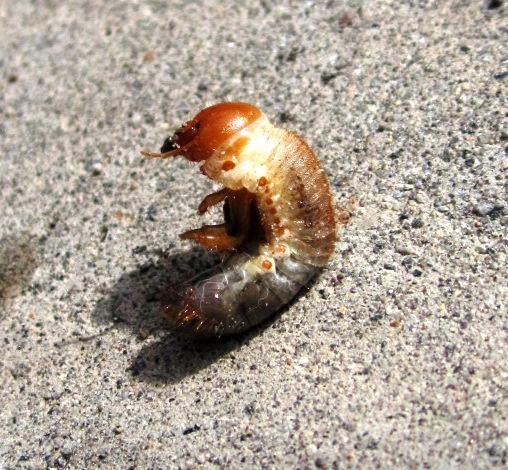
- The third instar of Lepidiota stigma

Scientific classification
- Kingdom: Animalia
- Phylum: Arthropoda
- Clade: Pancrustacea
- Class: Insecta
- Order: Coleoptera
- Suborder: Polyphaga
- Infraorder: Scarabaeiformia
- Family: Scarabaeidae
- Genus: Lepidiota
- Species: L. stigma

Binomial name
- Lepidiota stigma (Fabricius, 1798)

Synonyms
- Melolontha stigma Fabricius, 1801; Melolontha alba Olivier, 1789

= Lepidiota stigma =

Species of insect

Lepidiota stigma, also known as sugarcane white grub is a species of june beetle native to Southeast Asia. It has been recorded from India (Himachal Pradesh, Nagaland), Indonesia (Java, Sumatra) and Malaysia.

The species is known to attack sugarcane fields in the region.
