= Lepidiota minuta =

Scientific classification
- Kingdom: Animalia
- Phylum: Arthropoda
- Clade: Pancrustacea
- Class: Insecta
- Order: Coleoptera
- Suborder: Polyphaga
- Infraorder: Scarabaeiformia
- Family: Scarabaeidae
- Genus: Lepidiota
- Species: L. minuta

Binomial name
- Lepidiota minuta Moser, 1913

Species of beetle

Lepidiota minuta is a species of beetle of the family Scarabaeidae. It is found in Australia (Cape York Peninsula, Queensland).

== Description ==
Adults reach a length of about 13–14 mm (0.51–0.55 in). They are very similar to Lepidiota lepidosterna, and is distinguishable only by the form of the aedeagus.
