= Lepidiota arnhemensis =

Scientific classification
- Kingdom: Animalia
- Phylum: Arthropoda
- Clade: Pancrustacea
- Class: Insecta
- Order: Coleoptera
- Suborder: Polyphaga
- Infraorder: Scarabaeiformia
- Family: Scarabaeidae
- Genus: Lepidiota
- Species: L. arnhemensis

Binomial name
- Lepidiota arnhemensis Britton, 1978

Species of beetle

Lepidiota arnhemensis is a species of beetle of the family Scarabaeidae. It is found in Australia (Northern Territory).

== Description ==
Adults reach a length of about 19–22 mm (0.75–0.87 in). They are very similar to Lepidiota delicatula, but may be distinguished by the aedeagus of the males and the female genital armature.
