= Brifacia aragonensis =

Scientific classification
- Kingdom: Animalia
- Phylum: Annelida
- Clade: Pleistoannelida
- Clade: Sedentaria
- Order: Sabellida
- Family: Fabriciidae
- Genus: Brifacia
- Species: B. aragonensis

Binomial name
- Brifacia aragonensis Giangrande et al., 2014

Species of annelid

Brifacia aragonensis is a species of annelid worm in the class Polychaeta, which particularly lives in slightly acidified coastal systems in the Mediterranean Sea.
