= Fabrikirkia mazzellae =

Scientific classification
- Domain: Eukaryota
- Kingdom: Animalia
- Phylum: Annelida
- Clade: Pleistoannelida
- Clade: Sedentaria
- Order: Sabellida
- Family: Fabriciidae
- Genus: Fabrikirkia
- Species: F. mazzellae

Binomial name
- Fabrikirkia mazzellae (Giangrande, Gambi, Micheli & Kroeker, 2014)

Synonyms
- Parafabricia mazzellae Giangrande, Gambi, Micheli & Kroeker, 2014

Species of Polychaeta

Fabrikirkia mazzellae is a species of annelid worm in the class Polychaeta, which particularly lives in slightly acidified coastal systems in the Mediterranean Sea.
