= Lepidiota podicalis =

Scientific classification
- Kingdom: Animalia
- Phylum: Arthropoda
- Clade: Pancrustacea
- Class: Insecta
- Order: Coleoptera
- Suborder: Polyphaga
- Infraorder: Scarabaeiformia
- Family: Scarabaeidae
- Genus: Lepidiota
- Species: L. podicalis

Binomial name
- Lepidiota podicalis Moser, 1913

Synonyms
- Lepidiota platyura Lea, 1924

Species of beetle

Lepidiota podicalis is a species of beetle of the family Scarabaeidae. It is found in Australia (Cape York Peninsula, Queensland).

== Description ==
Adults reach a length of about 19–27 mm (0.75–1.06 in). The body is reddish-brown, sometimes with the head, pronotum and scutellum darker. The body is densely clothed with white scales.
