= Lepidiota degener =

Scientific classification
- Kingdom: Animalia
- Phylum: Arthropoda
- Clade: Pancrustacea
- Class: Insecta
- Order: Coleoptera
- Suborder: Polyphaga
- Infraorder: Scarabaeiformia
- Family: Scarabaeidae
- Genus: Lepidiota
- Species: L. degener

Binomial name
- Lepidiota degener Blackburn, 1888

Species of beetle

Lepidiota degener is a species of beetle of the family Scarabaeidae. It is found in Australia (northern Northern Territory).

== Description ==
Adults reach a length of about 14 mm (0.55 in). They have a dark reddish brown body.
