= Lepidiota acuminata =

Scientific classification
- Kingdom: Animalia
- Phylum: Arthropoda
- Clade: Pancrustacea
- Class: Insecta
- Order: Coleoptera
- Suborder: Polyphaga
- Infraorder: Scarabaeiformia
- Family: Scarabaeidae
- Genus: Lepidiota
- Species: L. acuminata

Binomial name
- Lepidiota acuminata Moser, 1913

Species of beetle

Lepidiota acuminata is a species of beetle of the family Scarabaeidae. It is found in Cambodia, Vietnam and China (Yunnan).

== Description ==
Adults reach a length of about 30 mm (1.2 in). They are olive green and dull, with small, pale yellow scales on the upper surface. The head is strongly punctured, each puncture bearing a small, broadly ovate scale. A few larger scales are present on the frons. The clypeus is large, with rounded sides and a very weakly emarginate anterior margin. The pronotum is rather densely punctured, the punctures bearing very small, round scales. On the scutellum, there is a very prominent spot on each side, formed from closely spaced, small, whitish-yellow scales. The elytra are moderately densely punctured, each puncture bearing a tiny scale. Along the margins of the ribs, which appear as unpunctured striae, there are a few larger, ovate scales. On the pygidium, the very small scales are arranged even more widely than on the elytra. The thorax is densely covered with yellowish hairs, while the abdomen is moderately densely covered with round or oval grey scales.
