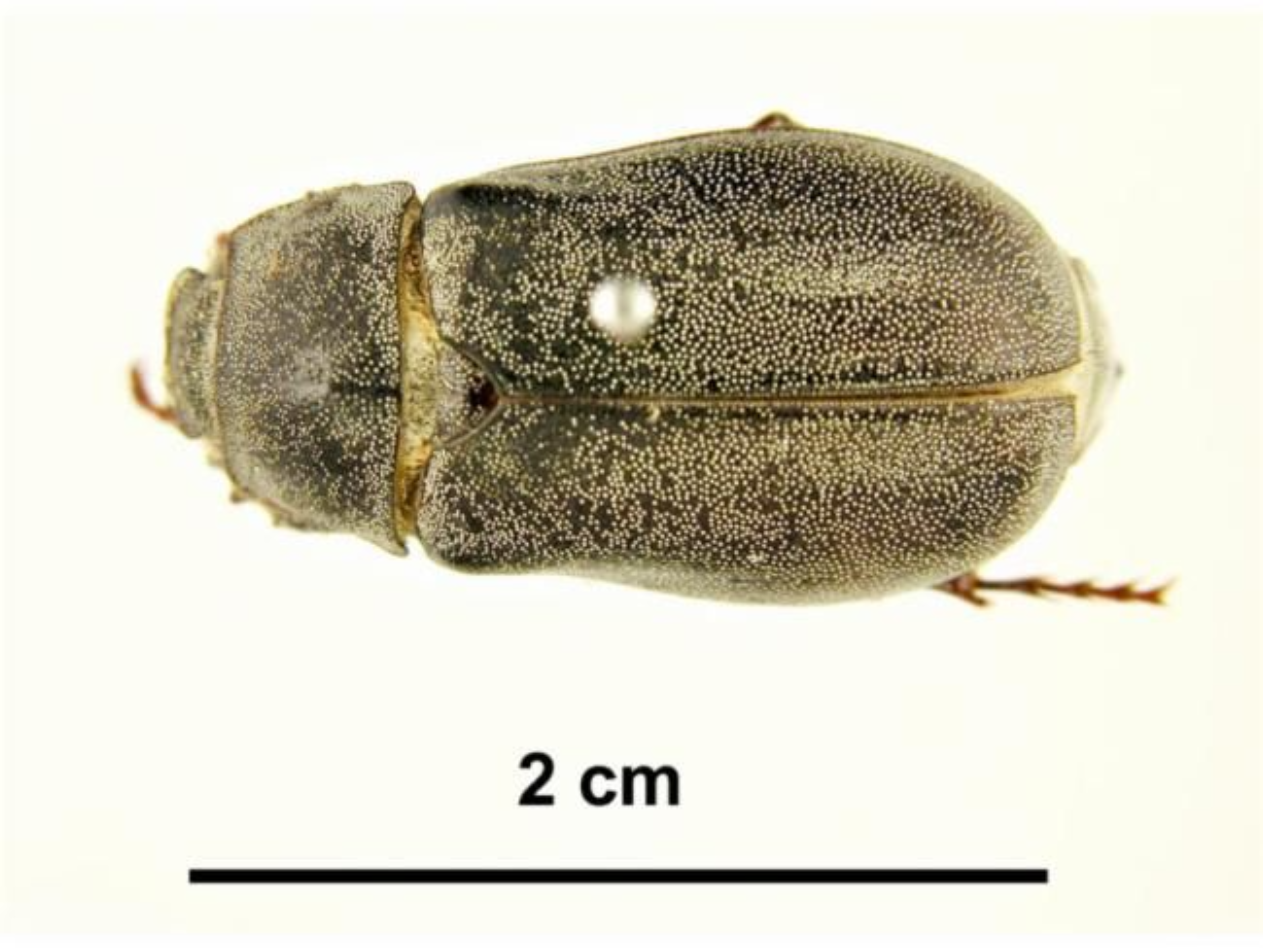

Scientific classification
- Kingdom: Animalia
- Phylum: Arthropoda
- Clade: Pancrustacea
- Class: Insecta
- Order: Coleoptera
- Suborder: Polyphaga
- Infraorder: Scarabaeiformia
- Family: Scarabaeidae
- Genus: Lepidiota
- Species: L. grisea

Binomial name
- Lepidiota grisea Britton, 1959

= Lepidiota grisea =

Species of beetle

Lepidiota grisea, the grisea canegrub, is a species of beetle of the family Scarabaeidae. It is found in Australia (Cape York Peninsula, Queensland).

== Description ==
Adults reach a length of about 22–27 mm (0.87–1.06 in). They are similar to Lepidiota squamuluta, but may be distinguished by the form of the aedeagus and the smaller, more rounded scales on the pronotum and elytra.

== Life history ==
The larvae have been recorded attacking the roots of sugar cane.
