= Manayunkia =

Scientific classification
- Kingdom: Animalia
- Phylum: Annelida
- Clade: Pleistoannelida
- Clade: Sedentaria
- Order: Sabellida
- Family: Fabriciidae
- Genus: Manayunkia; Leidy, 1859

Genus of annelids

Manayunkia is a genus of annelids belonging to the family Fabriciidae.

The genus has almost cosmopolitan distribution.

Species:

- Manayunkia aestuarina (Bourne, 1883)
- Manayunkia athalassia Hutchings, Dekker & Geddes, 1981
