= Lepidiota keyensis =

Scientific classification
- Kingdom: Animalia
- Phylum: Arthropoda
- Clade: Pancrustacea
- Class: Insecta
- Order: Coleoptera
- Suborder: Polyphaga
- Infraorder: Scarabaeiformia
- Family: Scarabaeidae
- Genus: Lepidiota
- Species: L. keyensis

Binomial name
- Lepidiota keyensis (Moser, 1912)

Synonyms
- Holotrichia keyensis Moser, 1912

Species of beetle

Lepidiota keyensis is a species of beetle of the family Scarabaeidae. It is found in Indonesia (Kai Islands).

== Description ==
Adults reach a length of about 18 mm (0.71 in). They are brown and shiny. The head is strongly punctured, the frons somewhat wrinkled, and the anterior margin of the clypeus is barely emarginate. The pronotum is arched slightly behind the middle, and its lateral margins are notched. The surface is sparsely punctured, becoming somewhat more densely punctate laterally. The scutellum bears a few coarse punctures. The elytra are moderately densely covered with strong punctures, the spaces between the punctures being weakly wrinkled. Ribs are absent except for the sutural rib. The pygidium is widely covered with umbilical punctures. The thorax is covered with yellow hairs, the abdomen is almost smooth in the middle, and sparsely punctate laterally.
