= Lepidiota draconis =

Scientific classification
- Kingdom: Animalia
- Phylum: Arthropoda
- Clade: Pancrustacea
- Class: Insecta
- Order: Coleoptera
- Suborder: Polyphaga
- Infraorder: Scarabaeiformia
- Family: Scarabaeidae
- Genus: Lepidiota
- Species: L. draconis

Binomial name
- Lepidiota draconis Britton, 1978

Species of beetle

Lepidiota draconis is a species of beetle of the family Scarabaeidae. It is found in Australia (Queensland).

== Description ==
Adults reach a length of about 18 mm (0.71 in). The head, pronotum and scutellum are dark reddish-brown, while the elytra are paler reddish-brown.
