= Lepidiota clareae =

Scientific classification
- Kingdom: Animalia
- Phylum: Arthropoda
- Clade: Pancrustacea
- Class: Insecta
- Order: Coleoptera
- Suborder: Polyphaga
- Infraorder: Scarabaeiformia
- Family: Scarabaeidae
- Genus: Lepidiota
- Species: L. clareae

Binomial name
- Lepidiota clareae Allsopp, 1999

Species of beetle

Lepidiota clareae is a species of beetle of the family Scarabaeidae. It is found in Australia (Queensland).

== Description ==
Adults reach a length of about 23.5 mm (0.93 in) for males and 26 mm (1.0 in) for females. The head, pronotum and ventral thorax are dark reddish-brown, while the elytra and abdomen are lighter reddish-brown. The dorsal and ventral surface are covered with white scales. The antennae are dark brown.

== Etymology ==
The species is named after the daughter of the author, Clare Allsopp.
