= Lepidiota weiri =

Scientific classification
- Kingdom: Animalia
- Phylum: Arthropoda
- Clade: Pancrustacea
- Class: Insecta
- Order: Coleoptera
- Suborder: Polyphaga
- Infraorder: Scarabaeiformia
- Family: Scarabaeidae
- Genus: Lepidiota
- Species: L. weiri

Binomial name
- Lepidiota weiri Britton, 1978

Species of beetle

Lepidiota weiri is a species of beetle of the family Scarabaeidae. It is found in Australia (Northern Territory).

== Description ==
Adults reach a length of about 14–16 mm (0.55–0.63 in). They are reddish-brown, with a slightly darker head and with white scales.
