= Lepidiota amitina =

Scientific classification
- Kingdom: Animalia
- Phylum: Arthropoda
- Clade: Pancrustacea
- Class: Insecta
- Order: Coleoptera
- Suborder: Polyphaga
- Infraorder: Scarabaeiformia
- Family: Scarabaeidae
- Genus: Lepidiota
- Species: L. amitina

Binomial name
- Lepidiota amitina Britton, 1978

Species of beetle

Lepidiota amitina is a species of beetle of the family Scarabaeidae. It is found in Australia (Western Australia).

== Description ==
Adults reach a length of about 28–33 mm (1.1–1.3 in). They have a dark reddish brown body.
