= Lepidiota yorkensis =

Scientific classification
- Kingdom: Animalia
- Phylum: Arthropoda
- Clade: Pancrustacea
- Class: Insecta
- Order: Coleoptera
- Suborder: Polyphaga
- Infraorder: Scarabaeiformia
- Family: Scarabaeidae
- Genus: Lepidiota
- Species: L. yorkensis

Binomial name
- Lepidiota yorkensis Britton, 1978

Species of beetle

Lepidiota yorkensis is a species of beetle of the family Scarabaeidae. It is found in Australia (Cape York Peninsula, Queensland).

== Description ==
Adults reach a length of about 21 mm (0.83 in). The head, pronotum and elytra are dark reddish-brown. The pronotum is shining and the elytra have a sericeous reflection.
