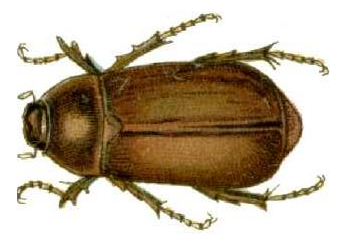
- Lepidiota consotbrina

Scientific classification
- Kingdom: Animalia
- Phylum: Arthropoda
- Clade: Pancrustacea
- Class: Insecta
- Order: Coleoptera
- Suborder: Polyphaga
- Infraorder: Scarabaeiformia
- Family: Scarabaeidae
- Subfamily: Melolonthinae
- Genus: Lepidiota; Kirby, 1828

Synonyms
- Eucirrus Melly, 1832

= Lepidiota =

Genus of insects

Lepidiota is a genus of beetles belonging to the family Scarabaeidae.

These beetles are large and cylindrical, measuring between 15-38mm in body length. Their body coloration varies and can be black, brown, dark brown or reddish brown, while their body surfaces are often covered in white or yellowish scales that may be sparsely or wholly contained within punctations. The clypeus is emarginate and appears bi-lobed, while the anterior face is shallow and typically smooth and unpunctured medially. The beetles have 10 segmented antennae (rarely 9 segmented) with a 3-segmented lamellate club, although two Australian species have 5 lamellae. The antennal club is not elongated and is usually shorter than the length of the first 7 segments. The beetles have an absent metasternal process and tarsal claws with a median tooth.

== Species ==
- Lepidiota acuminata Moser, 1913
- Lepidiota acuminatops Prokofiev, 2015
- Lepidiota adelphopyga Prokofiev, 2015
- Lepidiota aenigma Britton, 1978
- Lepidiota albistigma (Burmeister, 1855)
- Lepidiota alticalceus Allsopp, 1989
- Lepidiota amitina Britton, 1978
- Lepidiota annamensis Moser, 1913
- Lepidiota argentea Britton, 1978
- Lepidiota arnhemensis Britton, 1978
- Lepidiota aspera Britton, 1978
- Lepidiota astrolabensis Heller, 1914
- Lepidiota bakkeri Allsopp, 1999
- Lepidiota bidentata Allsopp, 1989
- Lepidiota bimaculata (Saunders, 1839)
- Lepidiota blanchardi Dalla Torre, 1912
- Lepidiota bonguana Brenske, 1895
- Lepidiota brenskei Moser, 1908
- Lepidiota brittoni Allsopp & Watkins, 1995
- Lepidiota brunnea Moser, 1913
- Lepidiota cabala Britton, 1978
- Lepidiota caesia (Burmeister, 1855)
- Lepidiota caudata Blackburn, 1890
- Lepidiota clareae Allsopp, 1999
- Lepidiota clypealis Moser, 1913
- Lepidiota cochinchinae Brenske, 1894
- Lepidiota comes Britton, 1978
- Lepidiota condita Britton, 1978
- Lepidiota consobrina Girault, 1918
- Lepidiota corporaali Moser, 1924
- Lepidiota crenaticollis Brenske, 1892
- Lepidiota crenulata (Wiedemann, 1821)
- Lepidiota degener Blackburn, 1888
- Lepidiota delicatula Blackburn, 1888
- Lepidiota discedens Sharp, 1876
- Lepidiota draconis Britton, 1978
- Lepidiota elongata Heller, 1914
- Lepidiota ferruginosa (Walker, 1859)
- Lepidiota flavimargo Arrow, 1919
- Lepidiota flavipennis Lea, 1926
- Lepidiota florens Sharp, 1876
- Lepidiota frenchi Blackburn, 1912
- Lepidiota gibbifrons Britton, 1978
- Lepidiota gilesi Blackburn, 1912
- Lepidiota grata Blackburn, 1890
- Lepidiota grisea Britton, 1959
- Lepidiota guttata Sharp, 1876
- Lepidiota heurni Moser, 1924
- Lepidiota hilli Britton, 1978
- Lepidiota hirsuta Brenske, 1892
- Lepidiota horni Moser, 1924
- Lepidiota impluviata Blanchard, 1851
- Lepidiota impressifrons Moser, 1913
- Lepidiota ingrata Heller, 1914
- Lepidiota insularum Arrow, 1943
- Lepidiota irokezica Prokofiev, 2015
- Lepidiota keyensis (Moser, 1912)
- Lepidiota labrata Brenske, 1892
- Lepidiota laciniata Britton, 1978
- Lepidiota lepidosterna Lea, 1926
- Lepidiota lineata Moser, 1913
- Lepidiota luctuosa Blanchard, 1851
- Lepidiota macrolepida Moser, 1913
- Lepidiota maculata Brenske, 1900
- Lepidiota mansueta (Burmeister, 1855)
- Lepidiota marginipennis Moser, 1913
- Lepidiota medvedevi Prokofiev, 2015
- Lepidiota mellyi (Melly, 1832)
- Lepidiota microlepida Moser, 1913
- Lepidiota milneana Moser, 1913
- Lepidiota minuta Moser, 1913
- Lepidiota munda Sharp, 1876
- Lepidiota negatoria Blackburn, 1912
- Lepidiota nho Prokofiev, 2015
- Lepidiota nicobarica Arrow, 1943
- Lepidiota nigricollis (Kirsch, 1877)
- Lepidiota nigrofusca Moser, 1913
- Lepidiota nonfriedi Brenske, 1892
- Lepidiota noxia Britton, 1985
- Lepidiota olivacea (Burmeister, 1855)
- Lepidiota omnipodex Prokofiev, 2015
- Lepidiota oryx Britton, 1959
- Lepidiota papua Heller, 1914
- Lepidiota pauper Brenske, 1892
- Lepidiota peninsularis Arrow, 1943
- Lepidiota pentaphylla Moser, 1913
- Lepidiota perkinsi Blackburn, 1912
- Lepidiota philippinica (Burmeister, 1855)
- Lepidiota podicalis Moser, 1913
- Lepidiota praecellens Bates, 1891
- Lepidiota pruinosula Heller, 1921
- Lepidiota punctatipennis Blanchard, 1851
- Lepidiota punctum Blanchard, 1851
- Lepidiota quinqueflabellata Moser, 1926
- Lepidiota quinquelineata MacLeay, 1884
- Lepidiota renardi Brenske, 1896
- Lepidiota reuleauxi Brenske, 1892
- Lepidiota rhizotrogoides Heller, 1914
- Lepidiota richteri Brenske, 1892
- Lepidiota robusta Moser, 1926
- Lepidiota ronensis Moser, 1913
- Lepidiota rothei Blackburn, 1888
- Lepidiota rubrior Blackburn, 1912
- Lepidiota rufa Blackburn, 1888
- Lepidiota rugifrons Moser, 1913
- Lepidiota rugosa Sharp, 1876
- Lepidiota rugosipennis Blanchard, 1851
- Lepidiota salax Britton, 1978
- Lepidiota salomona Moser, 1913
- Lepidiota scutata Moser, 1913
- Lepidiota scutellata MacLeay, 1884
- Lepidiota semonis Brenske, 1900
- Lepidiota serraticollis Moser, 1913
- Lepidiota siamensis Brenske, 1892
- Lepidiota sororia Moser, 1913
- Lepidiota sparsa Britton, 1978
- Lepidiota spinipennis Frey, 1975
- Lepidiota squalida MacLeay, 1886
- Lepidiota squamulata Waterhouse, 1875
- Lepidiota squamuligera (Kirsch, 1877)
- Lepidiota sticta Britton, 1978
- Lepidiota sticticoptera Blanchard, 1851
- Lepidiota stigma (Fabricius, 1801)
- Lepidiota stimulans Heller, 1914
- Lepidiota sus Brenske, 1892
- Lepidiota suspicax Dohrn, 1882
- Lepidiota tonkinensis Moser, 1908
- Lepidiota townsvillensis Blackburn, 1912
- Lepidiota tridens Sharp, 1876
- Lepidiota trihomines Allsopp, 1990
- Lepidiota uptoni Britton, 1978
- Lepidiota valida Heller, 1914
- Lepidiota weiri Britton, 1978
- Lepidiota yorkensis Britton, 1978
- Lepidiota yunshan Wang, 2025
