= Fabritius =

Fabritius is a North European surname. Bearers of the name include:

- Barent Fabritius (1624–1673), Dutch painter, brother of Carel and Johannes
- Bernd Fabritius (born 1965), German politician
- Carel Fabritius (1622–1654), Dutch painter, brother of Barent and Johannes
- Carl Ferdinand Fabritius (1637–1673), German landscape painter
- Johannes Fabritius (1636–1693), Dutch painter, brother of Barent and Carel
- Just Fabritius (1703–1766), Danish merchant, brother of Michael
- Laurentius Fabritius (1535–1600), German Catholic bishop
- Ludvig Fabritius (1648–1729) Swedish diplomat
- Michael Fabritius (1697–1746), Danish merchant and shipbuilder, brother of Just

== See also ==
- Fabritius de Tengnagel (noble family), originating in Brandenburg
- Fabricius (disambiguation)
- Fabrizio (disambiguation)
