= Lepidiota bakkeri =

Scientific classification
- Kingdom: Animalia
- Phylum: Arthropoda
- Clade: Pancrustacea
- Class: Insecta
- Order: Coleoptera
- Suborder: Polyphaga
- Infraorder: Scarabaeiformia
- Family: Scarabaeidae
- Genus: Lepidiota
- Species: L. bakkeri

Binomial name
- Lepidiota bakkeri Allsopp, 1999

Species of beetle

Lepidiota bakkeri is a species of beetle of the family Scarabaeidae. It is found in Australia (Western Australia).

== Description ==
Adults reach a length of about 23–25 mm (0.91–0.98 in) for males and 24 mm (0.94 in) for females. The head, pronotum, pygidium, venter and legs are reddish-brown, while the elytra are paler and have a dull sheen. The antennae are yellowish-brown to dark brown.

== Etymology ==
The species is named after a colleague of the author, Peter Bakker, who collected the type series.
