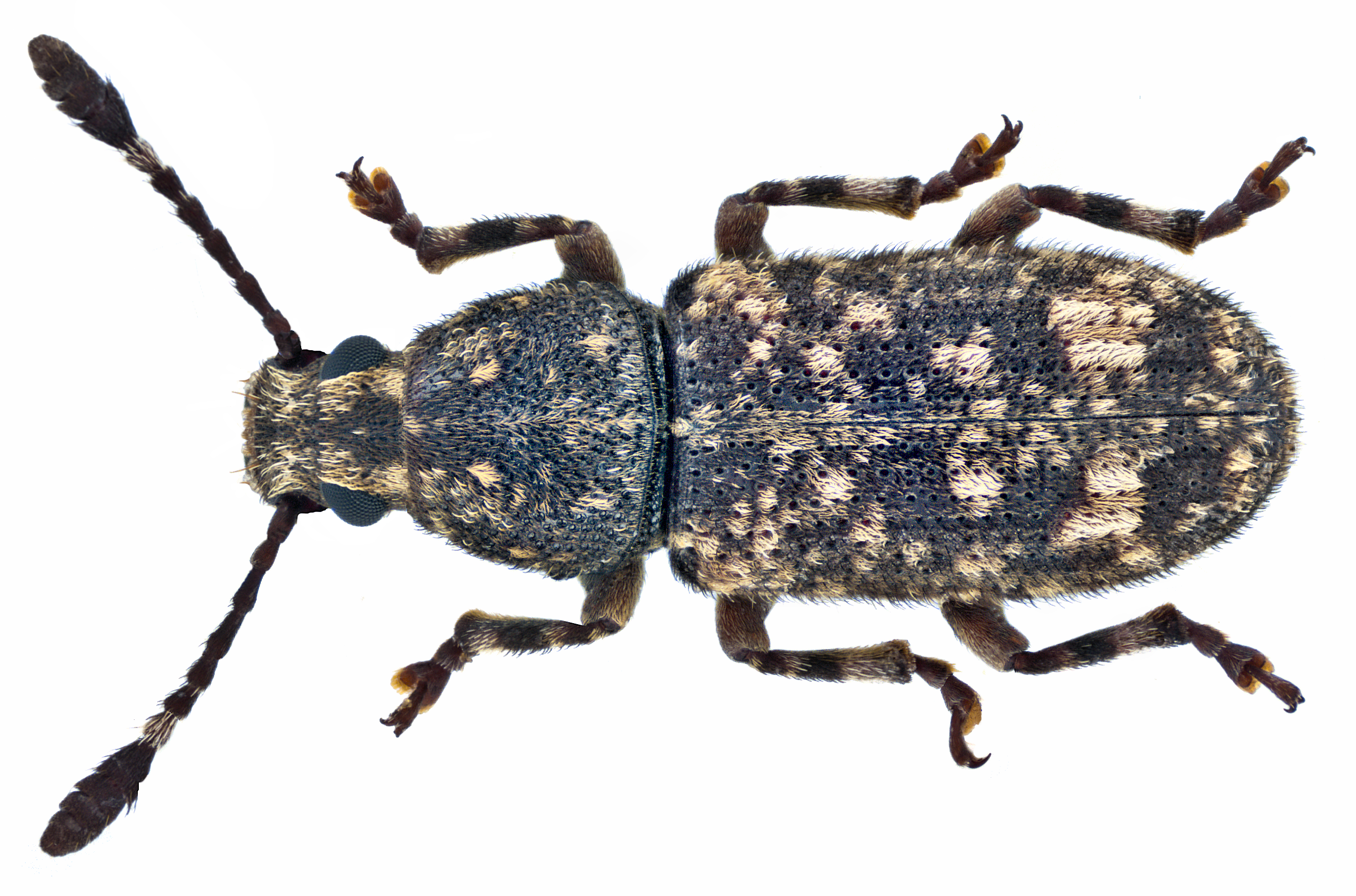

Scientific classification
- Kingdom: Animalia
- Phylum: Arthropoda
- Clade: Pancrustacea
- Class: Insecta
- Order: Coleoptera
- Suborder: Polyphaga
- Infraorder: Cucujiformia
- Family: Anthribidae
- Genus: Eucorynus
- Species: E. crassicornis

Binomial name
- Eucorynus crassicornis (Fabricius, 1801)

Synonyms
- Eucorynus clavator Fairmaire, L. 1903; Eucorynus setosulus Pascoe, F.P. 1859; Eucorynus colligendus Walker, F. 1859; Eucorynus stevensi Pascoe, F.P. 1859; Eucorynus mastersi Blackburn, T. 1900

= Eucorynus crassicornis =

Species of beetle

Eucorynus crassicornis is a species of fungus weevil in the beetle family Anthribidae, which was first described in 1801 by Johan Christian Fabricius as Anthribus crassicornis, from specimen(s) collected in Sumatra.

It has been found in South Korea (Jeju Island), Japan, Far East Russia, China, Taiwan, Thailand, Malaysia, Singapore, the Philippines, India, and Australia.

In Indonesia, this weevil damages the pods and seeds of the legume crops Crotalaria striata, other Crotalaria species, and those of Leucaena leucocephala. In Kerala, it has been found to be a major destroyer of stored bamboo.
