= Lepidiota oryx =

Scientific classification
- Kingdom: Animalia
- Phylum: Arthropoda
- Clade: Pancrustacea
- Class: Insecta
- Order: Coleoptera
- Suborder: Polyphaga
- Infraorder: Scarabaeiformia
- Family: Scarabaeidae
- Genus: Lepidiota
- Species: L. oryx

Binomial name
- Lepidiota oryx Britton, 1959

Species of beetle

Lepidiota oryx is a species of beetle of the family Scarabaeidae. It is found in Australia (Northern Territory).

== Description ==
Adults reach a length of about 18–22 mm (0.71–0.87 in). They are very similar to Lepidiota perkinsi, but may be distinguished by the shape of the clypeus, denser punctuation of the frons and (usually) the presence of punctures on the middle third of the clypeus.
