= Lepidiota cabala =

Scientific classification
- Kingdom: Animalia
- Phylum: Arthropoda
- Clade: Pancrustacea
- Class: Insecta
- Order: Coleoptera
- Suborder: Polyphaga
- Infraorder: Scarabaeiformia
- Family: Scarabaeidae
- Genus: Lepidiota
- Species: L. cabala

Binomial name
- Lepidiota cabala Britton, 1978

Species of beetle

Lepidiota cabala is a species of beetle of the family Scarabaeidae. It is found in Australia (Northern Territory).

== Description ==
Adults reach a length of about 20–24 mm (0.79–0.94 in). They are similar to Lepidiota aenigma, but may be distinguished by the shape of the aedeagus.
