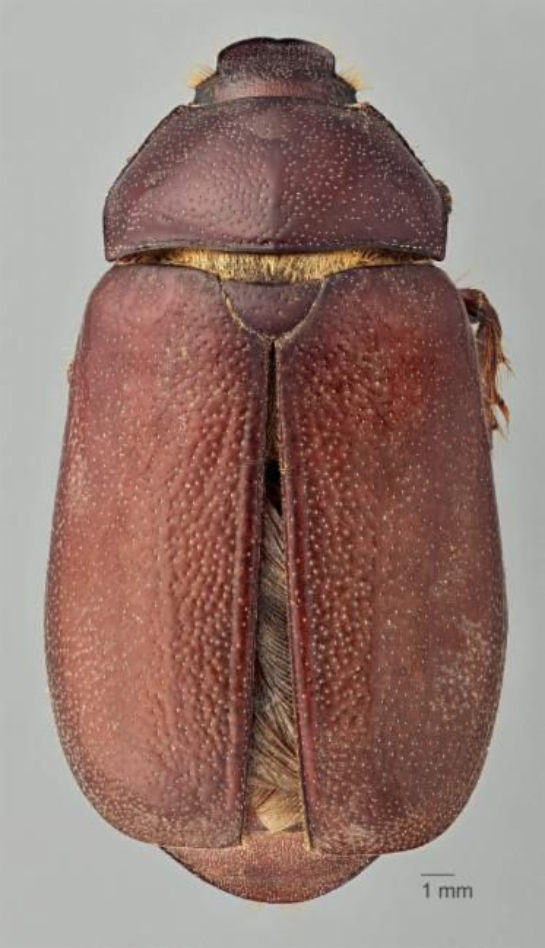

Scientific classification
- Kingdom: Animalia
- Phylum: Arthropoda
- Clade: Pancrustacea
- Class: Insecta
- Order: Coleoptera
- Suborder: Polyphaga
- Infraorder: Scarabaeiformia
- Family: Scarabaeidae
- Genus: Lepidiota
- Species: L. trihomines

Binomial name
- Lepidiota trihomines Allsopp, 1990

= Lepidiota trihomines =

Species of beetle

Lepidiota trihomines is a species of beetle of the family Scarabaeidae. It is found in Australia (northern Queensland).

== Description ==
Adults reach a length of about 25 mm (0.98 in). The head, pronotum and scutellum are very dark reddish-brown, while the elytra, pygidium and venter are slightly lighter.

== Etymology ==
The species name is derived from Latin tri- (meaning three) and homines (meaning people) and refers to the three collectors of the holotype.
