= Lepidiota townsvillensis =

Scientific classification
- Kingdom: Animalia
- Phylum: Arthropoda
- Clade: Pancrustacea
- Class: Insecta
- Order: Coleoptera
- Suborder: Polyphaga
- Infraorder: Scarabaeiformia
- Family: Scarabaeidae
- Genus: Lepidiota
- Species: L. townsvillensis

Binomial name
- Lepidiota townsvillensis Blackburn, 1912

Species of beetle

Lepidiota townsvillensis is a species of beetle of the family Scarabaeidae. It is found in Australia (Queensland).

== Description ==
Adults reach a length of about 20 mm (0.79 in). They are light reddish brown, with the posterior half of the frons darker.
