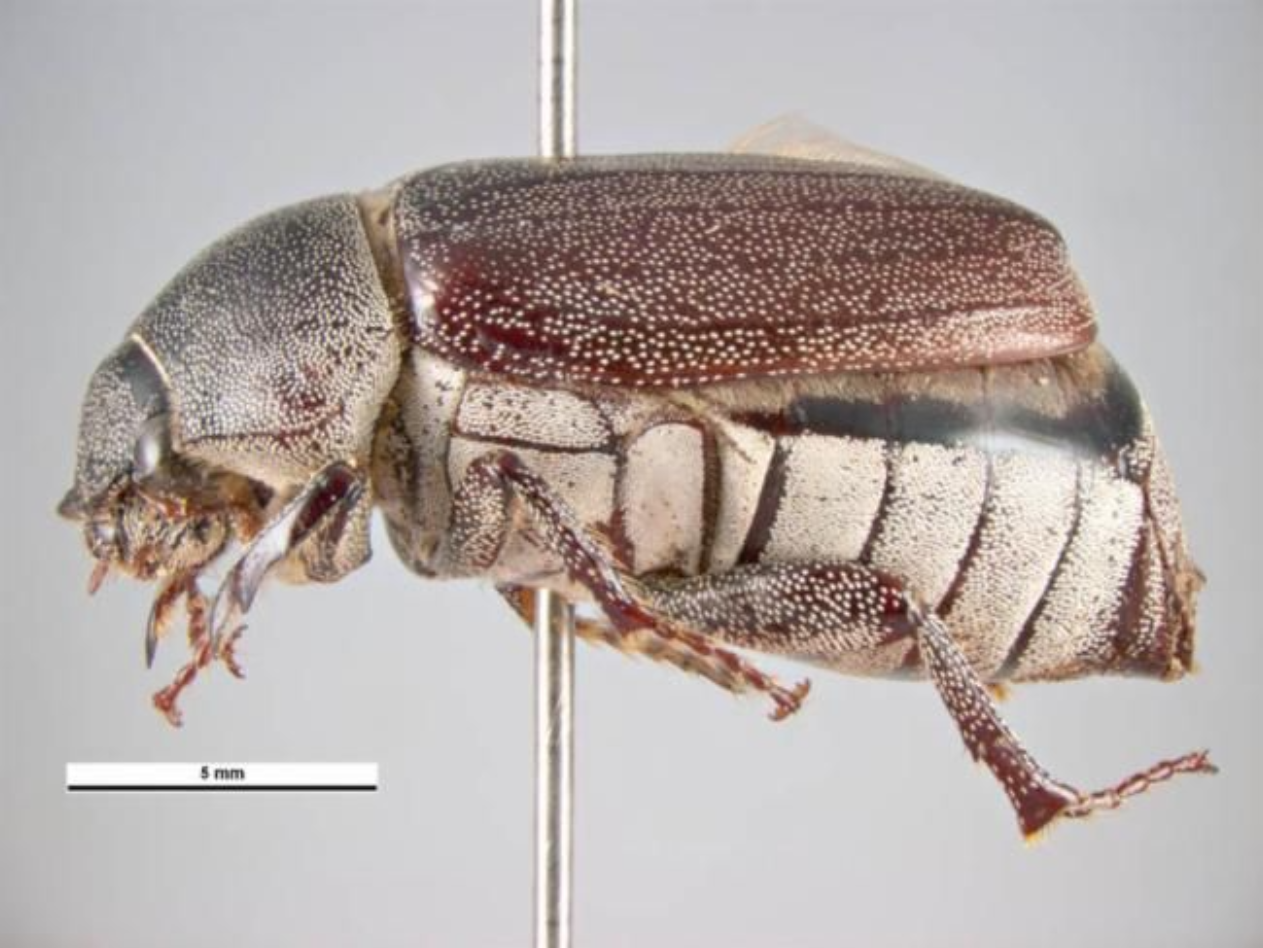

Scientific classification
- Kingdom: Animalia
- Phylum: Arthropoda
- Clade: Pancrustacea
- Class: Insecta
- Order: Coleoptera
- Suborder: Polyphaga
- Infraorder: Scarabaeiformia
- Family: Scarabaeidae
- Genus: Lepidiota
- Species: L. rothei

Binomial name
- Lepidiota rothei Blackburn, 1888

Synonyms
- Lepidiota parva Moser, 1913; Lepidiota bovilli Blackburn, 1912; Lepidiota koebelei Blackburn, 1912; Lepidiota oblonga Brenske, 1900

= Lepidiota rothei =

Species of beetle

Lepidiota rothei, the brown eucalypt beetle, is a species of beetle of the family Scarabaeidae. It is found in Australia (northern Queensland, northern Northern Territory).

== Description ==
Adults reach a length of about 15–19 mm (0.59–0.75 in). They have a very dark reddish brown body.
