= Lepidiota annamensis =

Scientific classification
- Kingdom: Animalia
- Phylum: Arthropoda
- Clade: Pancrustacea
- Class: Insecta
- Order: Coleoptera
- Suborder: Polyphaga
- Infraorder: Scarabaeiformia
- Family: Scarabaeidae
- Genus: Lepidiota
- Species: L. annamensis

Binomial name
- Lepidiota annamensis Moser, 1913

Species of beetle

Lepidiota annamensis is a species of beetle of the family Scarabaeidae. It is found in Vietnam.

== Description ==
Adults reach a length of about 33 mm (1.3 in). The head is coarsely punctate and the punctures are densely spaced on the clypeus and the posterior part of the frons, and widely spaced on the anterior part of the latter. On the frons, the punctures bear ovate scales, while those on the clypeus bear lanceolate scales. The pronotum is moderately densely punctate, and each puncture bears a small, rounded scale. In the posterior part of the middle, there is a smooth longitudinal line. The lateral margins are very weakly crenulated and fringed with yellowish cilia. The scutellum is scaled in the anterior half and smooth in the posterior half. Apart from the sutural rib, the elytra show no further ribs that are very indistinct. The punctation is somewhat more widely spaced than on the pronotum, and the rounded scales of the punctures are minute. The pygidium is fairly densely punctate, and the punctures bear ovate scales. The thorax is densely covered with greyish-yellow hairs. The abdomen is moderately densely covered with grey oval scales in the middle, and densely covered along the sides and the entire penultimate abdominal segment. In addition, the abdomen bears scattered yellowish setae.
