= Lepidiota comes =

Scientific classification
- Kingdom: Animalia
- Phylum: Arthropoda
- Clade: Pancrustacea
- Class: Insecta
- Order: Coleoptera
- Suborder: Polyphaga
- Infraorder: Scarabaeiformia
- Family: Scarabaeidae
- Genus: Lepidiota
- Species: L. comes

Binomial name
- Lepidiota comes Britton, 1978

Species of beetle

Lepidiota comes is a species of beetle of the family Scarabaeidae. It is found in Australia (Cape York Peninsula, Queensland).

== Description ==
Adults reach a length of about 20 mm (0.79 in). The dorsal surface is dark brown and shining and the clypeus and frons are deeply punctured, while the punctures on the pronotum and elytra are more sparse.
