= Lepidiota salax =

Scientific classification
- Kingdom: Animalia
- Phylum: Arthropoda
- Clade: Pancrustacea
- Class: Insecta
- Order: Coleoptera
- Suborder: Polyphaga
- Infraorder: Scarabaeiformia
- Family: Scarabaeidae
- Genus: Lepidiota
- Species: L. salax

Binomial name
- Lepidiota salax Britton, 1978

Species of beetle

Lepidiota salax is a species of beetle of the family Scarabaeidae. It is found in Australia (Queensland).

== Description ==
Adults reach a length of about 17 mm (0.67 in). They are dark yellowish brown, with the base of the head dark brown.
