= Lepidiota aspera =

Scientific classification
- Kingdom: Animalia
- Phylum: Arthropoda
- Clade: Pancrustacea
- Class: Insecta
- Order: Coleoptera
- Suborder: Polyphaga
- Infraorder: Scarabaeiformia
- Family: Scarabaeidae
- Genus: Lepidiota
- Species: L. aspera

Binomial name
- Lepidiota aspera Britton, 1978

Species of beetle

Lepidiota aspera is a species of beetle of the family Scarabaeidae. It is found in Australia (Cape York Peninsula, Queensland and the Torres Strait Islands).

== Description ==
Adults reach a length of about 21 mm (0.83 in). The head and pronotum are very dark brown, while the scutellum and elytra are dark reddish-brown.
