= Brifacia =

Scientific classification
- Kingdom: Animalia
- Phylum: Annelida
- Clade: Pleistoannelida
- Clade: Sedentaria
- Order: Sabellida
- Family: Fabriciidae
- Genus: Brifacia; Fitzhugh, 1998

Species
- Brifacia aragonensis Giangrande, Gambi, Micheli & Kroeker, 2014; Brifacia metastellaris Fitzhugh, 1998

Genus of annelid

Brifacia is a genus of annelid worm in the class Polychaeta.
