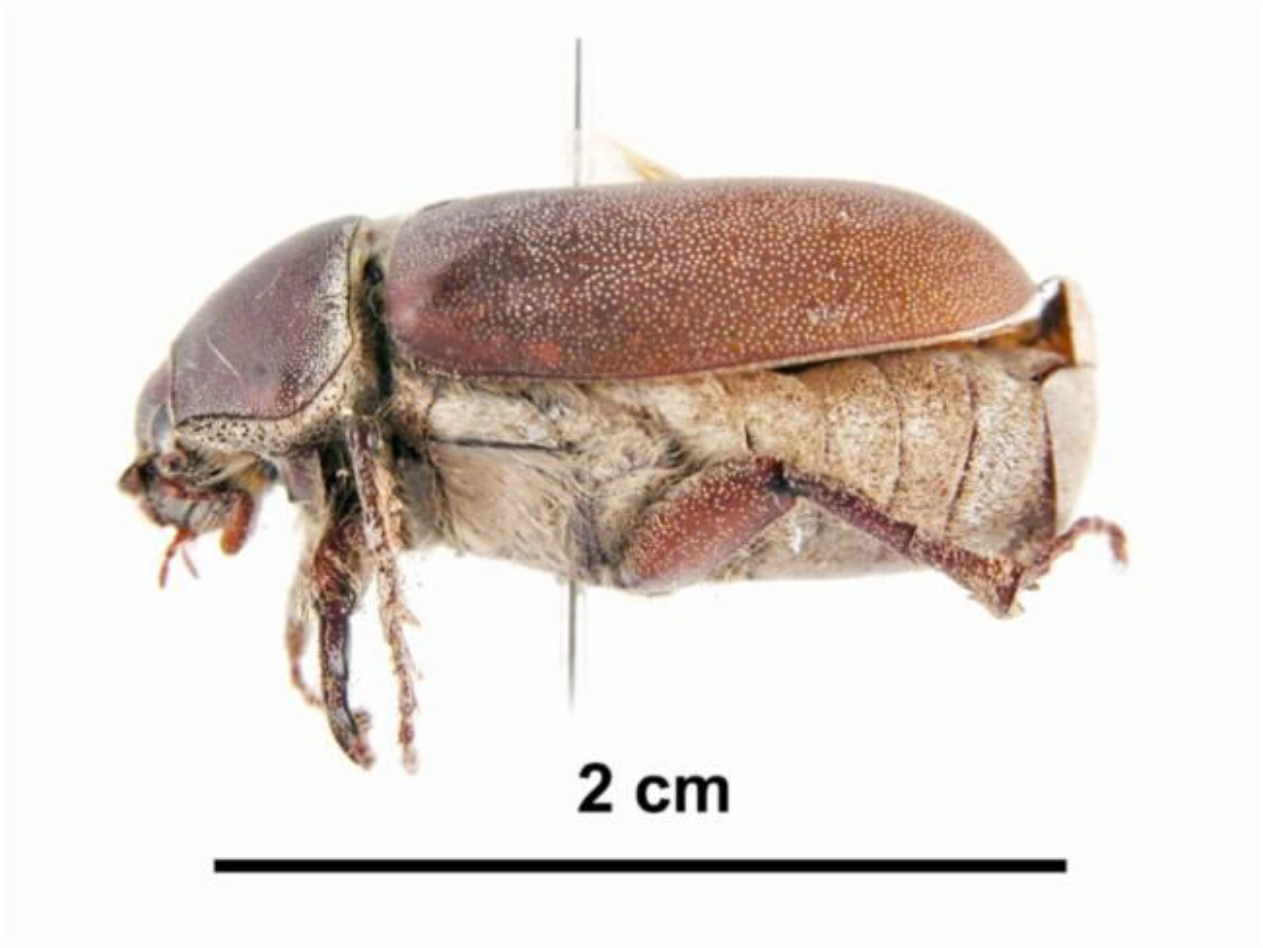

Scientific classification
- Kingdom: Animalia
- Phylum: Arthropoda
- Clade: Pancrustacea
- Class: Insecta
- Order: Coleoptera
- Suborder: Polyphaga
- Infraorder: Scarabaeiformia
- Family: Scarabaeidae
- Genus: Lepidiota
- Species: L. sororia

Binomial name
- Lepidiota sororia Moser, 1913

Synonyms
- Lepidiota wilsoni Britton, 1958

= Lepidiota sororia =

Species of beetle

Lepidiota sororia is a species of beetle of the family Scarabaeidae. It is found in Australia (north-eastern Queensland).

== Description ==
Adults reach a length of about 19–22 mm (0.75–0.87 in). The body is reddish, appearing paler due to the fairly uniform clothing of white scales.

== Life history ==
Larvae have been recorded attacking young sugar cane. Adults appear in August.
