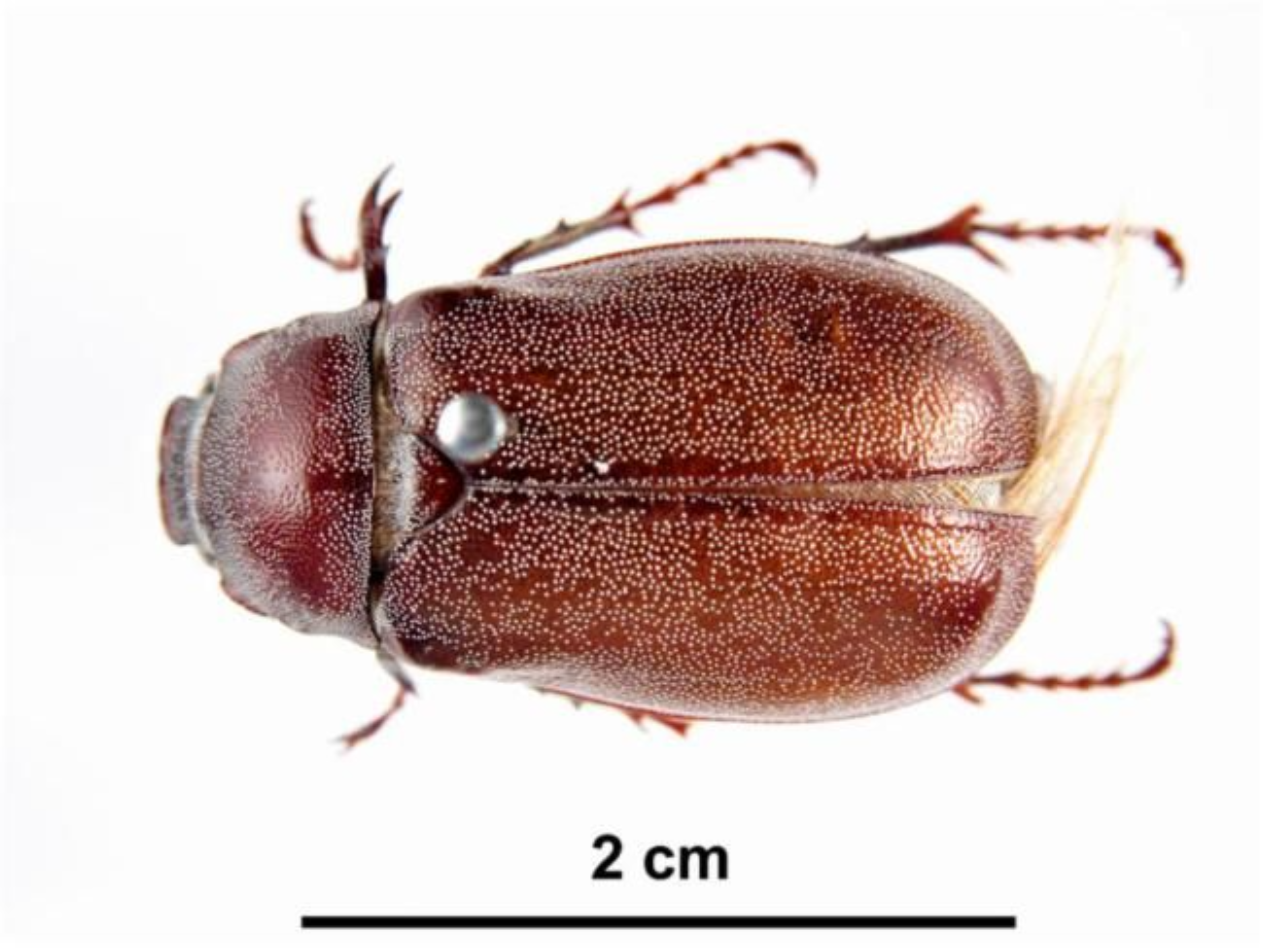

Scientific classification
- Kingdom: Animalia
- Phylum: Arthropoda
- Clade: Pancrustacea
- Class: Insecta
- Order: Coleoptera
- Suborder: Polyphaga
- Infraorder: Scarabaeiformia
- Family: Scarabaeidae
- Genus: Lepidiota
- Species: L. squamulata

Binomial name
- Lepidiota squamulata Waterhouse, 1875

Synonyms
- Lepidiota rugosipennis Lea, 1924; Lepidiota leai Blackburn, 1912; Lepidiota darwini Blackburn, 1888

= Lepidiota squamulata =

Species of beetle

Lepidiota squamulata, the canegrub, is a species of beetle of the family Scarabaeidae. It is found in New Guinea and Australia (Western Australia, Northern Territory, Queensland, South Australia).

== Description ==
Adults reach a length of about 22–32 mm (0.87–1.26 in). The density of the scales varies greatly, making specimens appear to be white to dark brown in colour.

== Life history ==
They are considered a pest of sugar cane.
