= Lepidiota laciniata =

Scientific classification
- Kingdom: Animalia
- Phylum: Arthropoda
- Clade: Pancrustacea
- Class: Insecta
- Order: Coleoptera
- Suborder: Polyphaga
- Infraorder: Scarabaeiformia
- Family: Scarabaeidae
- Genus: Lepidiota
- Species: L. laciniata

Binomial name
- Lepidiota laciniata Britton, 1978

Species of beetle

Lepidiota laciniata is a species of beetle of the family Scarabaeidae. It is found in Australia (coastal Queensland).

== Description ==
Adults reach a length of about 24 mm (0.94 in). They are dark reddish-brown with large white scales.
