= Fabricia (annelid) =

Scientific classification
- Kingdom: Animalia
- Phylum: Annelida
- Clade: Pleistoannelida
- Clade: Sedentaria
- Order: Sabellida
- Family: Fabriciidae
- Genus: Fabricia; Blainville, 1828

Genus of annelid worms

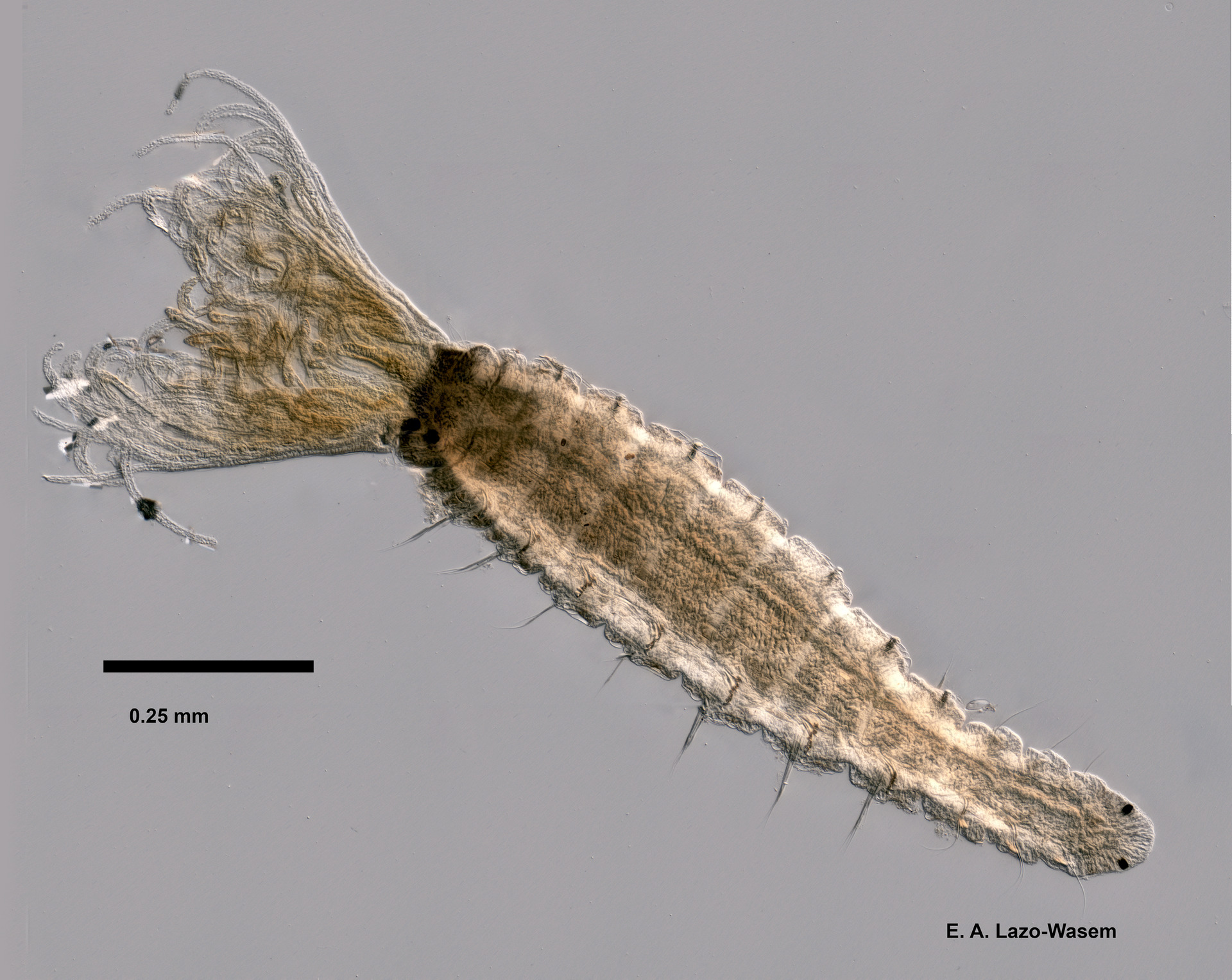
Fabricia stellaris, preserved specimen

Fabricia is a genus of polychaetes belonging to the family Fabriciidae.

The genus has almost cosmopolitan distribution.

Species:

- Fabricia acuseta Banse, 1959
- Fabricia crenicolis
- Fabricia gracilis Grube, 1855
- Fabricia stellaris (Müller, 1774)
- Fabricia ventrilinguata Johansson, 1922
