= Lepidiota negatoria =

Scientific classification
- Kingdom: Animalia
- Phylum: Arthropoda
- Clade: Pancrustacea
- Class: Insecta
- Order: Coleoptera
- Suborder: Polyphaga
- Infraorder: Scarabaeiformia
- Family: Scarabaeidae
- Genus: Lepidiota
- Species: L. negatoria

Binomial name
- Lepidiota negatoria Blackburn, 1912

Synonyms
- Lepidiota mungomeryi Britton, 1963; Lepidiota deceptrix Blackburn, 1912

Species of beetle

Lepidiota negatoria is a species of beetle of the family Scarabaeidae. It is found in Australia (coast of southern Queensland and coast of northern New South Wales).

== Description ==
Adults reach a length of about 21–28 mm (0.83–1.10 in). The body is dark reddish-brown, with the dorsal and ventral surface bearing large white scales.
