= Lepidiota delicatula =

Scientific classification
- Kingdom: Animalia
- Phylum: Arthropoda
- Clade: Pancrustacea
- Class: Insecta
- Order: Coleoptera
- Suborder: Polyphaga
- Infraorder: Scarabaeiformia
- Family: Scarabaeidae
- Genus: Lepidiota
- Species: L. delicatula

Binomial name
- Lepidiota delicatula Blackburn, 1888

Synonyms
- Lepidiota suavior Blackburn, 1912

Species of beetle

Lepidiota delicatula is a species of beetle of the family Scarabaeidae. It is found in Australia (Northern Territory).

== Description ==
Adults reach a length of about 18–22 mm (0.71–0.87 in). The body is reddish brown, with the elytra paler than the head and pronotum. The elytra, scutellum and margins of the pronotum appear paler by a dense covering of white scales.
