= Fabrice Lokembo-Lokaso =

Congolese footballer

Personal information
- Full name: Fabrice Lokembo-Lokaso
- Date of birth: 31 October 1982 (age 44)
- Place of birth: Kinshasa, Zaire
- Height: 1.82 m (6 ft 0 in)
- Position: Defender

Youth career
- R. Charleroi

Senior career*
Years	Team	Apps	(Gls)
2002–2005	R. Charleroi	41	(0)
2005–2006	Maccabi Petah Tikva	9	(1)
2006–2007	Paralimni		
2007–2008	Olympiakos Nicosia		
2008–2010	AEK Larnaca		
2010–2011	Charleroi CF		
- * Club domestic league appearances and goals

Fabrice Lokembo-Lokaso (born 31 October 1982) is a Congolese retired football defender of Congolese origin. He played for Enosis Neon Paralimni FC and had been given on loan for a year to Olympiakos Nicosia. In 2008, he moved to AEK Larnaca.

== Club career ==
Lokembo-Lokaso played for R. Charleroi S.C. in the Belgian Jupiler League from 2002 through 2005.

In 2016, he was sentenced to 10 months' imprisonment by a court in Dunkerque, France for his part in a cross-Channel people-smuggling operation.
