= Fabrício (footballer, born 1978) =

Brazilian footballer

Personal information
- Full name: Elton Fabrício Minhoto
- Date of birth: September 14, 1978
- Place of birth: Clementina, Brazil
- Date of death: 24 May 2019 (aged 40)
- Place of death: Clementina, Brazil
- Height: 1.76 m (5 ft 9 in)
- Position: Defensive midfielder

Youth career
- 1997–1999: São Paulo

Senior career*
Years	Team	Apps	(Gls)
1998–1999	São Paulo	11	(0)
2000–2002	Paraná		
2002–2003	Uberaba		
2004–2006	América Mineiro		
2007	Uberlândia		
2007	Uberaba		
2008	Democrata-SL		
- * Club domestic league appearances and goals as of 24 September 2023

Elton Fabrício Minhoto (14 September 1978 – 24 May 2019), simply known as Fabrício, was a Brazilian professional footballer who played as a defensive midfielder.

== Career ==
Started in the youth categories, Fabrício played for São Paulo FC in the 1998 and 1999 seasons, being traded to Paraná Clube. Afterwards, he played for several football clubs in the state of Minas Gerais.

== Death ==
Fabrício died at the age of 40 in his hometown, a victim of leukemia.
