= Fabrício (footballer, born 1995) =

Brazilian footballer

Personal information
- Full name: Fabrício Ramos da Silva
- Date of birth: 29 March 1995 (age 31)
- Position: Midfielder

Youth career
- 2011: Palmeiras
- 2014: Desportivo Brasil
- 2015: Audax

Senior career*
Years	Team	Apps	(Gls)
2016	Caldense		
2016–2017	Olhanense	4	(0)
2018–2019	Confiança	2	(0)
- * Club domestic league appearances and goals as of 23:47, 20 May 2019 (UTC)

Fabrício Ramos da Silva, known as Fabrício Silva or simply Fabrício (born 29 March 1995) is a Brazilian football player who most recently played for Confiança.

== Club career ==
He made his professional debut in the Segunda Liga for Olhanense on 21 September 2016 in a game against Varzim.
