= Fabricio =

Fabricio (Spanish pronunciation: [faˈβɾiθjo, -sjo]) is a Spanish male given name. Fabrício (Portuguese pronunciation: [faˈβɾisju]) is the Portuguese equivalent.

Among those with the first name are:

- Fabricio Agosto (born 1987), Spanish footballer
- Fabrício Barros (born 1998), Brazilian para-athlete
- Fabricio Bustos (born 1996), Argentine footballer
- Fabricio Coloccini (born 1982), Argentine footballer
- Fabricio Fontanini (born 1990), Argentine footballer
- Fabricio Fuentes (born 1976), Argentine retired footballer
- Fabrício Guerreiro (born 1990), Brazilian mixed martial artist
- Fabricio Lenci (born 1984), Argentine footballer
- Fabricio Oberto (born 1975), Argentine basketball player
- Fabricio Pedrozo (born 1992), Argentine footballer
- Fabrício Ramos da Silva (born 1995), Brazilian footballer
- Fabricio Ramos Melo (born 1986), Brazilian footballer
- Fabrício de Souza (born 1982), Brazilian former footballer
- Fabricio Vay (born 1986), Argentine basketball player
- Fabrício Werdum (born 1977), Brazilian mixed martial artist
- Fabrício (footballer, born 1978), born Elton Fabrício Minhoto, Brazilian football midfielder
- Fabrício (footballer, born 1982), born Fabrício André Pires, Brazilian football midfielder
- Fabrício (footballer, born January 1986), born Fabrício Barros Santana, Brazilian football goalkeeper
- Fabrício (footballer, born June 1986), born Fabrício Ramos Melo, Brazilian football midfielder
- Fabrício (footballer, born 1987), born Fabrício dos Santos Silva, Brazilian football midfielder
- Fabrício (footballer, born February 1990), Fabrício Silva Dornellas, Brazilian football centre-back
- Fabrício (footballer, born 1995), born Fabrício Ramos da Silva, Brazilian football midfielder
- Fabrício (footballer, born June 2000), born Fabrício Oliveira de Souza, Brazilian football goalkeeper
- Fabrício (footballer, born October 2000), born Fabrício do Rosário dos Santos, Brazilian football forward

== See also ==
- Fabrizio (disambiguation)
