= Fabrice Langlade =

French sculptor (born 1964)

- Born: 1964 (age 61–62)
- Known for: Sculpting

Fabrice Langlade (born 1964) is a French sculptor.

== Biography ==
Fabrice Langlade lives and works in Montreuil, France.

His work has been exhibited in museums, art institutions and public spaces in France and internationally. His sculptures are held in several public collections, including the Musée des Beaux-Arts de Calais, the Kyoto Costume Institute, FRAC Île-de-France – Le Plateau, and the Musée de la Chasse et de la Nature.

== Selected exhibitions ==
- Les Liaisons heureuses, Musée des Beaux-Arts de Calais, 2006
- October Salon, National Museum of Belgrade, Serbia, 2007
- Micro-narratives: Tentation des petites réalités, Musée d’art moderne de Saint-Étienne, 2008
- Nature fragile, Musée de la Chasse et de la Nature, Paris, 2008
- Mythos Kindheit, Haus für Kunst Uri, Switzerland, 2009
- Chasse au fantôme, Musée de la Chasse et de la Nature, Paris, 2010
- WANI, Fondation d'entreprise Ricard, Paris, 2011
- L, FRAC Île-de-France – Château de Rentilly, 2018
- SNARK, Palazzo Contarini della Porta di Ferro, Venice, 2024

== Works in situ ==
- Django, Anglet, France, 2016
- Monsieur, Lorraine, France, 2013
- UNPONTENPORCELAINEENMONGOLIE, Orkhon Valley, Mongolia, 2010–2014
- AHGHA, Nuit Blanche, Paris, 2010

== Bibliography ==
- Uurga, BlackJack Editions, 2011, ISBN 978-2-918063-13-1
