= Fabrizio =

Fabrizio is an Italian first name, from the Latin word "Faber" meaning "smith" and may refer to:

- Fabrizio Angileri (born 1994), Argentine footballer
- Fabrizio Barbazza (born 1963), Italian Formula One driver
- Fabrizio Barca (born 1954), Italian politician
- Fabrizio Brienza (born 1969), Italian model and actor
- Fabrizio Castori (born 1954), Italian football coach
- Fabrizio Cornegliani (born 1969), Italian para-cyclist
- Fabrizio De André (1940–1999), Italian singer-songwriter
- Fabrizio Di Bella (born 1988), Italian footballer
- Fabrizio Dori, Italian comics artist
- Fabrizio Faniello (born 1981), Maltese singer
- Fabrizio Ferracane (born 1975), Italian actor
- Fabrizio Giovanardi (born 1966), Italian racing driver
- Fabrizio Miccoli (born 1979), Italian footballer
- Fabrizio Moreira (born 1982), Ecuadorian politician
- Fabrizio Moretti (born 1980), Brazilian-American drummer in the band The Strokes
- Fabrizio Moretti (art dealer) (born 1976), Italian art dealer
- Fabrizio Moro (born 1975), Italian singer-songwriter
- Fabrizio Nieva (born 1964), Argentine boxer
- Fabrizio Palermo (born 1971), Italian CEO and General Manager
- Fabrizio Plessi (1940–2026), Italian installation artist
- Fabrizio Ravanelli (born 1968), Italian footballer
- Fabrizio Romano (born 1993), Italian journalist
- Fabrizio Rongione (born 1973), Belgian screenwriter, film producer and actor
- Fabrizio Ruffo (1744–1827), Neapolitan cardinal and politician
- Fabrizio Saccomanni (1942–2019), Italian politician

== See also ==
- Fabricius (disambiguation)
- Fabritius (disambiguation)
- Fabricio
