= Lepidiota clypealis =

Scientific classification
- Kingdom: Animalia
- Phylum: Arthropoda
- Clade: Pancrustacea
- Class: Insecta
- Order: Coleoptera
- Suborder: Polyphaga
- Infraorder: Scarabaeiformia
- Family: Scarabaeidae
- Genus: Lepidiota
- Species: L. clypealis

Binomial name
- Lepidiota clypealis Moser, 1913

Species of beetle

Lepidiota clypealis is a species of beetle of the family Scarabaeidae. It is found in Australia (southern Queensland).

== Description ==
Adults reach a length of about 18 mm (0.71 in). They have a dark reddish brown body.
