= Lepidiota rubrior =

Scientific classification
- Kingdom: Animalia
- Phylum: Arthropoda
- Clade: Pancrustacea
- Class: Insecta
- Order: Coleoptera
- Suborder: Polyphaga
- Infraorder: Scarabaeiformia
- Family: Scarabaeidae
- Genus: Lepidiota
- Species: L. rubrior

Binomial name
- Lepidiota rubrior Blackburn, 1912

Synonyms
- Lepidiota rugicollis Moser, 1913

Species of beetle

Lepidiota rubrior is a species of beetle of the family Scarabaeidae. It is found in Australia (northern Queensland).

== Description ==
Adults reach a length of about 17–22 mm (0.67–0.87 in). They have a dark reddish brown body.
