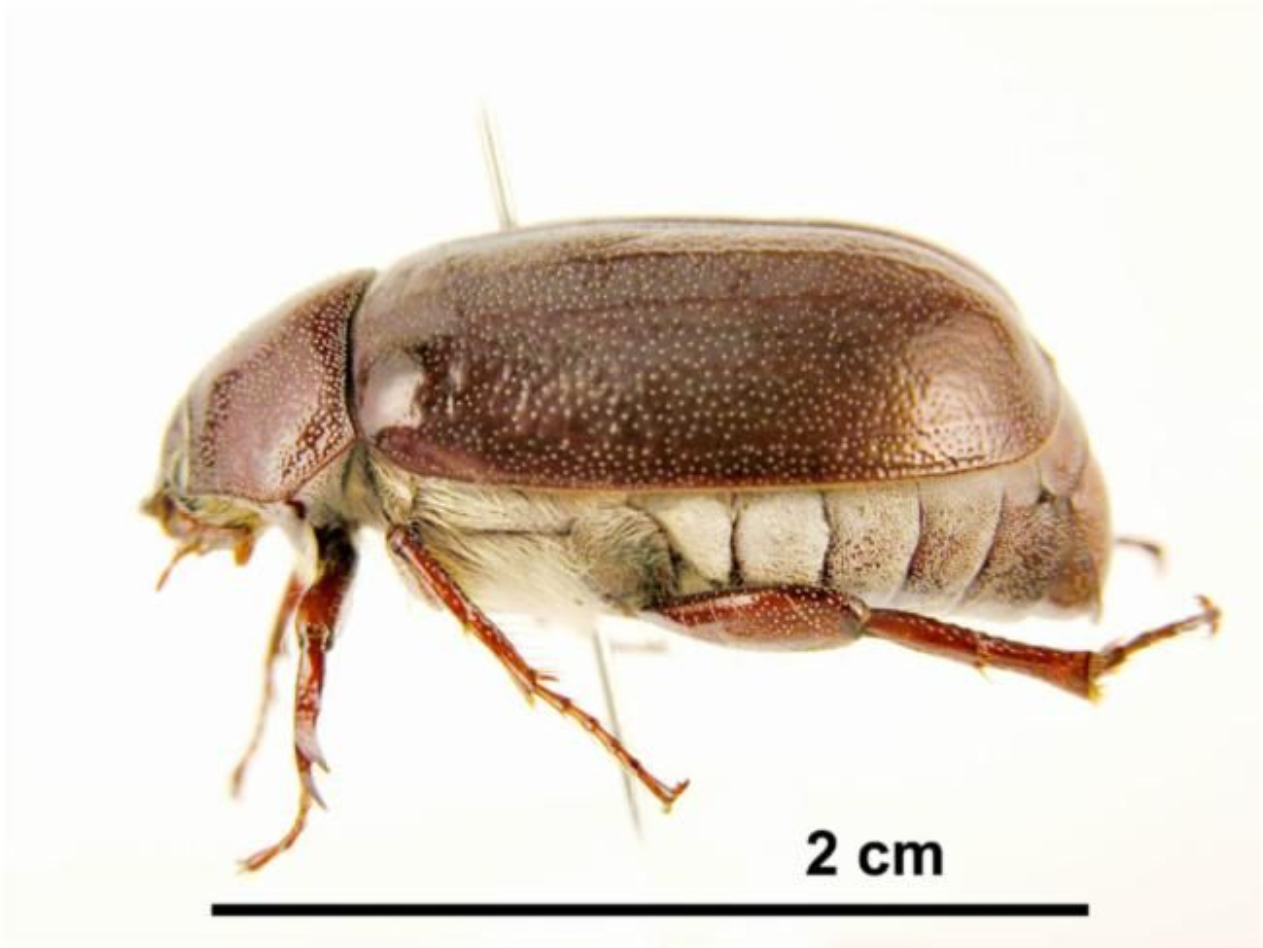

Scientific classification
- Kingdom: Animalia
- Phylum: Arthropoda
- Clade: Pancrustacea
- Class: Insecta
- Order: Coleoptera
- Suborder: Polyphaga
- Infraorder: Scarabaeiformia
- Family: Scarabaeidae
- Genus: Lepidiota
- Species: L. caudata

Binomial name
- Lepidiota caudata Blackburn, 1890

= Lepidiota caudata =

Species of beetle

Lepidiota caudata, the caudata whitegrub, is a species of beetle of the family Scarabaeidae. It is found in Australia (northern Queensland).

== Description ==
Adults reach a length of about 21–34 mm (0.83–1.34 in). They are dark reddish brown, with the clypeus densely punctured.
