= Francis Fabricius =

Low Countries physician (c. 1510–1572)

Francis Fabricius (c. 1510–1572) was a physician and humanist from the Low Countries. Fabricius was born in Roermond around 1510 and studied the humanities in Cologne, where he excelled at Latin and Greek. He went on to study medicine and in 1533 was established as a physician in Deventer. From 1545 to 1552 he was based in Aachen, where he studied the medicinal properties of the thermal springs. He died in 1572.

== Works ==
- Thermae aquenses, sive de Balneorum naturalium (Cologne, Jaspar Gennepaeus, 1546). Reprinted 1564, 1617.
  - In Dutch as Van den warmen baden, ende in sunderheyt den genen die tot Aken sijn (Maastricht, Jacob Bathen, 1552).
