= Fabricius =

Fabricius (Latin: smith, German: Schmied, Schmidt) is a surname. Notable people with the surname include:

- people from the Ancient Roman gens Fabricia:
  - Gaius Fabricius Luscinus, the first of the Fabricii to move to Rome
- B. Fabricius, pseudonym of Heinrich Theodor Dittrich, German philologist and librarian
- Camilla Fabricius (born 1971), Danish politician
- Carel Fabritius (sometimes spelled Fabricius, 1622–1654), Dutch painter
- David Fabricius (1564–1617), German pastor and astronomer
- Dionysius Fabricius (1564–1617), Chronicler who worked in Livonia
- Eric Fabricius (1901–1969), Finnish sailor
- Ernst Fabricius (1857–1942), German historian, archaeologist and scholar
- Filip Fabricius (1570–1632), Bohemian Catholic officer
- Francis Fabricius (c. 1510–1572), Low Countries physician
- Gábor Fabricius (born 1975), Hungarian writer and filmmaker
- Georg Fabricius (1516–1571), German poet, historian and archaeologist
- Hieronymus Fabricius or Girolamo Fabrizio (1537–1619), Italian anatomist
- Hildanus Fabricius (Wilhelm Fabry) (1560–1634), German anatomist and surgeon
- Jacob Christian Fabricius (1840–1919), Danish councilor, musician, and composer
- Jan Fabricius (1871–1964), Dutch journalist and playwright
- Jens Schou Fabricius (1758–1841), Norwegian naval officer
- Johan Christian Fabricius (1745–1808), Danish botanist and entomologist
- Johan Fabricius (1899–1981), Dutch writer, journalist and adventurer
- Johann Albert Fabricius (1668–1736), German classical scholar, publisher, and librarian
- Johann Phillip Fabricius (1711–1791), German Christian missionary in southern India
- Johannes Fabricius, (1587–1615), Frisian astronomer, discoverer of sunspots
- Karl Fabricius (born 1982), Swedish professional ice hockey winger
- Kenneth Fabricius (born 1981), Danish footballer
- Nanna Øland Fabricius (born 1985), Danish singer-songwriter
- Otto Fabricius (1744–1822), Danish missionary and scientist
- Preben Fabricius (1931–1984), Danish furniture designer
- Quintus Fabricius, Roman Senator
- Werner Fabricius (1633–1679), German composer and organist
- Alexander Carpenter, Latinized Fabricius, (fl. 1429), English religious philosopher and author

== See also ==
- Fabrizio (disambiguation)
- Fabritius (disambiguation)
