= Lepidiota lepidosterna =

Scientific classification
- Kingdom: Animalia
- Phylum: Arthropoda
- Clade: Pancrustacea
- Class: Insecta
- Order: Coleoptera
- Suborder: Polyphaga
- Infraorder: Scarabaeiformia
- Family: Scarabaeidae
- Genus: Lepidiota
- Species: L. lepidosterna

Binomial name
- Lepidiota lepidosterna Lea, 1926

Species of beetle

Lepidiota lepidosterna is a species of beetle of the family Scarabaeidae. It is found in Australia (northern Northern Territory, Queensland).

== Description ==
Adults reach a length of about 14–17 mm (0.55–0.67 in). They are reddish-brown and fairly densely clothed with white scales.
