= Lepidiota perkinsi =

Scientific classification
- Kingdom: Animalia
- Phylum: Arthropoda
- Clade: Pancrustacea
- Class: Insecta
- Order: Coleoptera
- Suborder: Polyphaga
- Infraorder: Scarabaeiformia
- Family: Scarabaeidae
- Genus: Lepidiota
- Species: L. perkinsi

Binomial name
- Lepidiota perkinsi Blackburn, 1912

Species of beetle

Lepidiota perkinsi is a species of beetle of the family Scarabaeidae. It is found in Australia (Northern Territory, Queensland).

== Description ==
Adults reach a length of about 20–25 mm (0.79–0.98 in). The head and pronotum are dark brown, while the scutellum and elytra are dark reddish brown.
