= Lepidiota aenigma =

Scientific classification
- Kingdom: Animalia
- Phylum: Arthropoda
- Clade: Pancrustacea
- Class: Insecta
- Order: Coleoptera
- Suborder: Polyphaga
- Infraorder: Scarabaeiformia
- Family: Scarabaeidae
- Genus: Lepidiota
- Species: L. aenigma

Binomial name
- Lepidiota aenigma Britton, 1978

Species of beetle

Lepidiota aenigma is a species of beetle of the family Scarabaeidae. It is found in Australia (Groote Eylandt, Northern Territory).

== Description ==
Adults reach a length of about 16–24 mm (0.63–0.94 in). The head, pronotum and scutellum are dark reddish brown, while the elytra are pale yellowish brown. The pronotum is margined with dense white scales.
