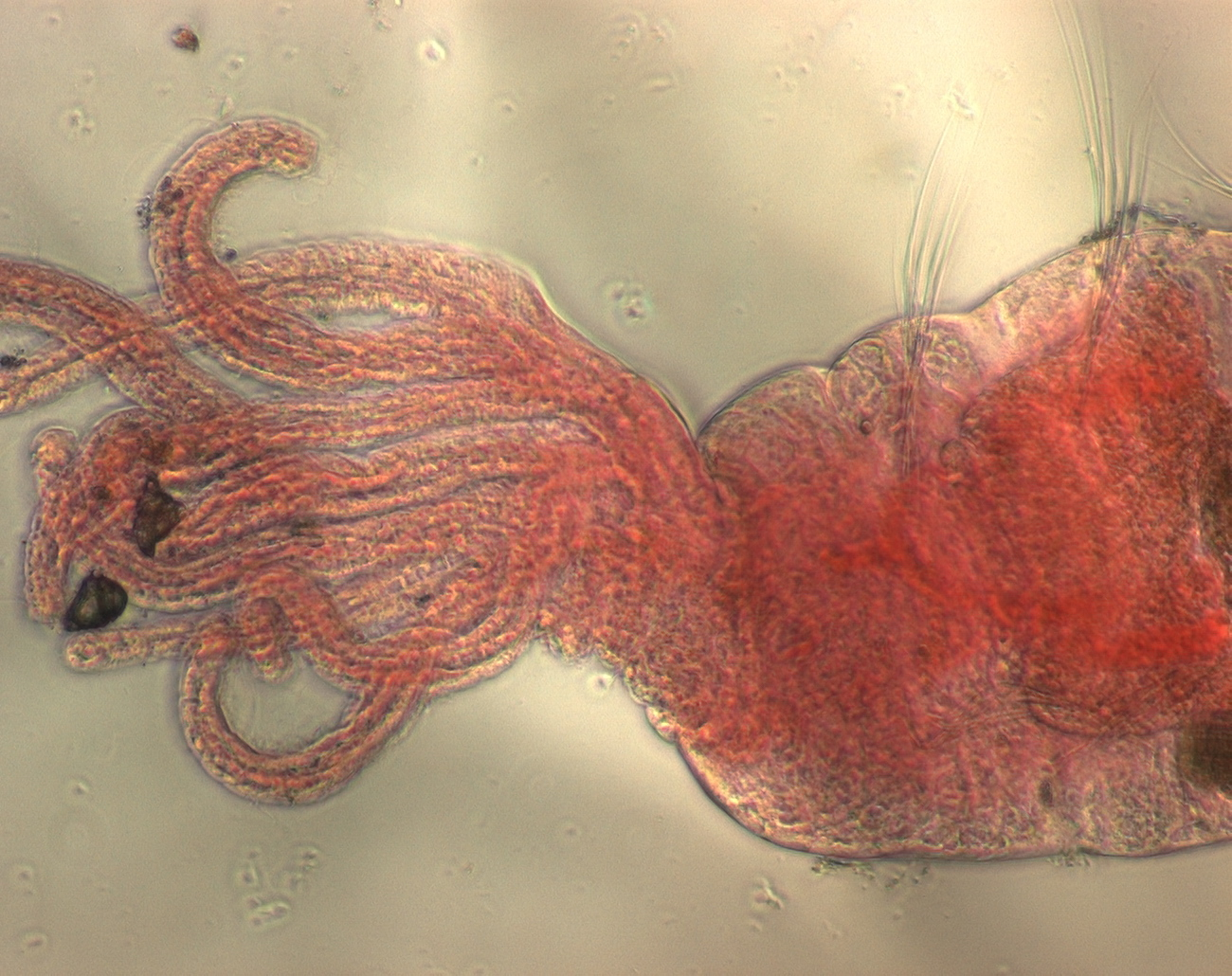
- Manayunkia aestuarina

Scientific classification
- Domain: Eukaryota
- Kingdom: Animalia
- Phylum: Annelida
- Clade: Pleistoannelida
- Clade: Sedentaria
- Infraclass: Canalipalpata
- Order: Sabellida
- Family: Fabriciidae; Rioja, 1923

Genera
- See text

= Fabriciidae =

Family of annelids

Fabriciidae is a family of annelid worm in the class Polychaeta.

== Genera ==
Genera within Fabriciidae include:

- Augeneriella Banse, 1957
- Bansella Fitzhugh, 2010
- Brandtika Jones, 1974
- Brifacia Fitzhugh, 1998
- Echinofabricia Huang, Fitzhugh & Rouse, 2011
- Fabricia Blainville, 1828
- Fabricinuda Fitzhugh, 1990
- Fabriciola Friedrich, 1939
- Fabrikirkia López & Cepeda, 2021
- Leiobranchus Quatrefages, 1850
- Leptochone
- Manayunkia Leidy, 1859
- Monroika Hartman, 1951
- Novafabricia Fitzhugh, 1990
- Pseudoaugeneriella Fitzhugh, 1998
- Pseudofabricia Cantone, 1972
- Pseudofabriciola Fitzhugh, 1990
- Raficiba Fitzhugh, 2001
- Rubifabriciola Huang, Fitzhugh & Rouse, 2011
- Tuba Renier, 1804

Genera brought into synonymy:

- Amphicora Ehrenberg, 1836 accepted as Fabricia Blainville, 1828 (subjective synonym)
- Eriographis Grube, 1850 accepted as Myxicola Koch in Renier, 1847 (subjective synonym)
- Haplobranchus Bourne, 1883 accepted as Manayunkia Leidy, 1859 (objective synonymy (type species))
- Oridia Rioja, 1917 accepted as Amphicorina Claparède, 1864 (replaced junior homonym, invalid replacement name for Oria)
