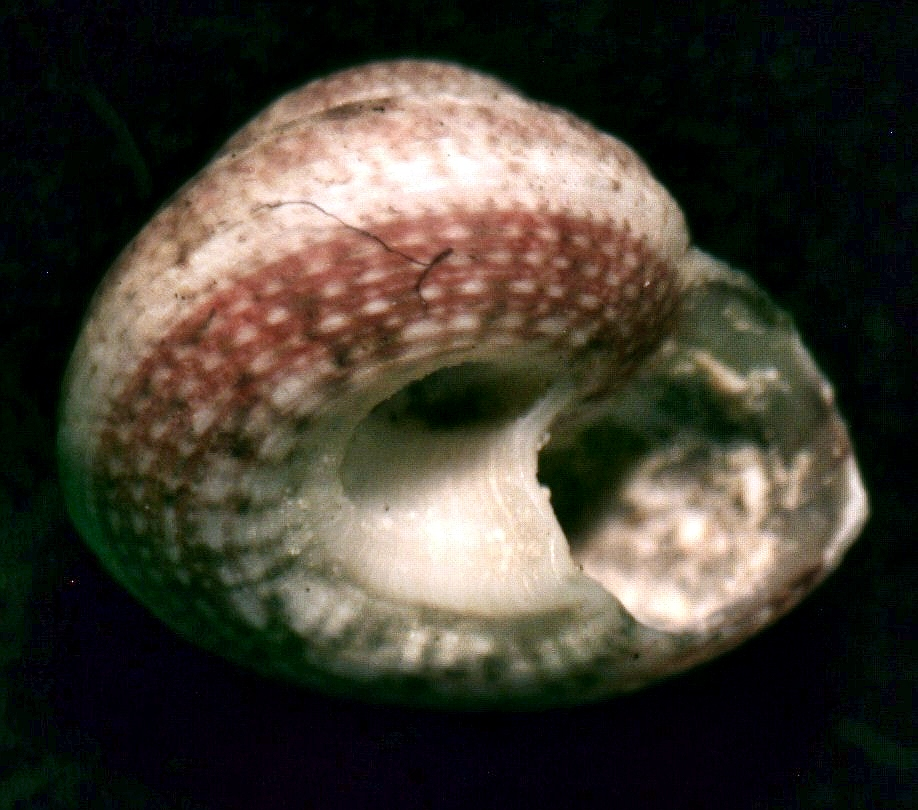
- A shell of Solariella sanjuanensis

Scientific classification
- Kingdom: Animalia
- Phylum: Mollusca
- Class: Gastropoda
- Subclass: Vetigastropoda
- Order: Trochida
- Family: Solariellidae
- Genus: Solariella; S. Wood, 1842

Type species
- † Solariella maculata Wood, 1842

Synonyms
- Machaeroplax Friele, 1877; Margarita (Solariella) S. Wood, 1842; Minolia (Machaeroplax) Friele, 1877; Monilea (Solariella) S.V. Wood, 1840 ·; † Solariella (Periaulax) Cossmann, 1888 · accepted, alternate representation; Trochus (Solariella) S. Wood, 1842

= Solariella =

Genus of gastropods

Solariella is a genus of small to minute sea snails, marine gastropod molluscs in the family Solariellidae within the superfamily Trochoidea, the top snails, turban snails and their allies.

This genus was founded by S. Wood for an English fossil trochid, conical in form, with tubular whorls and a deep umbilicus, its margin crenulated.

== Species ==
According to the World Register of Marine Species (WoRMS), the following species with valid names are included within the genus Solariella

- Solariella amabilis (Jeffreys, 1865)
- Solariella anarensis Dell, 1972
- Solariella antarctica Powell, 1958
- Solariella bathyantarctica Numanami, 1996
- Solariella bermejoi Rolán, Hernández & Deniz, 2005
- † Solariella bimarginata (Deshayes, 1863)
- Solariella brychia (R. B. Watson, 1879)
- Solariella cancilla Dall, 1927
- † Solariella carinata (Laws, 1935)
- Solariella carvalhoi Loper and Cardoso, 1958
- Solariella chani Vilvens, 2009
- Solariella charopa (Watson, 1879)
- † Solariella cheloti Le Renard, 1994
- Solariella chodon Vilvens, 2009
- Solariella cincta (Philippi, 1836)
- Solariella cingulima (Locard, 1898)
- Solariella cristata Quinn, 1992
- Solariella crossata (Dall, 1927)
- Solariella dedonderorum (Poppe, Tagaro & Dekker, 2006)
- Solariella delicata Dall, 1919
- Solariella depressa (Dall, 1889)
- Solariella diomedea Dall, 1919
- † Solariella discreta (Deshayes, 1863)
- † Solariella dumasi (Cossmann, 1907)
- † Solariella duvergieri Cossmann & Peyrot, 1917
- Solariella dowi Barnard, 1963 (taxon inquirendum)
- Solariella elegantula Dall, 1925
- † Solariella filosa Cossmann, 1888 †
- † Solariella fossa (Laws, 1932)
- Solariella galkini Bagirov, 1995
- † Solariella grata (Deshayes, 1863)
- † Solariella griesbachi Kiel, 2003
- Solariella inoptanda (Locard, 1898)
- Solariella intermedia (Leche, 1878) - intermediate solarelle
- Solariella iris (Dall, 1881)
- Solariella kempi A.W.B. Powell, 1951
- Solariella lacunella (Dall, 1881) - channeled solarelle
- † Solariella lenis (Marwick, 1928)
- Solariella lupe Rolán, Hernández & Deniz, 2005
- Solariella lusitanica (P. Fischer, 1887)
- † Solariella maculata Wood, 1842
- Solariella margaritifera (Okutani, 1964)
- Solariella marginata Schepman, 1908
- † Solariella marginulata (Philippi, 1844)
- † Solariella marshalli (P. A. Maxwell, 1992)
- Solariella micraulax J. H. McLean, 1964 - fine-groove solarelle
- † Solariella miosuturalis (Kautsky, 1925)
- Solariella multirestis Quinn, 1979
- Solariella nanshaensis Zhengzhi, 2002
- Solariella neglecta Thiele, 1925
- Solariella obscura (Couthouy, 1838) - obscure solarelle
- Solariella patriae Carcelles, 1953
- Solariella periomphalia (E. von Martens, 1901)
- Solariella periscopia Dall, 1927 - look-around solarelle
- Solariella peristicta Marshall, 1999
- Solariella plakhus Vilvens, 2009
- Solariella pompholugota (Watson, 1879)
- Solariella pygmaea Poppe, Tagaro & Dekker, 2006
- Solariella quinni Barros & Pereira, 2008
- Solariella rhina (R. B. Watson, 1886)
- Solariella sanjuanensis Poppe, Tagaro & Dekker, 2006
- Solariella segersi (Poppe, Tagaro & Dekker, 2006)
- † Solariella simplex (Deshayes, 1863)
- † Solariella spirata (Lamarck, 1804)
- †Solariella straeleni Glibert, 1952
- † Solariella susanae P. A. Maxwell, 1988
- Solariella tavernia Dall, 1919
- Solariella tenuicollaris Golikov & Sirenko, 1998
- Solariella triplostephanus Dall, 1910
- † Solariella trivialis Lozouet, 2015
- † Solariella trochiformis (Deshayes, 1832)
- † Solariella trochulus (Deshayes, 1863)
- Solariella tubula Dall, 1927
- † Solariella turbinoides (Lamarck, 1804)
- Solariella vancouverensis (E. A. Smith, 1880)
- Solariella varicosa (Mighels & C. B. Adams, 1842) - varicose solarelle
- Solariella zacalles Melvill, 1903

== Species brought into synonymy ==
- Solariella (Microgaza) Dall, 1881 represented as Microgaza Dall, 1881 (alternate representation)
- Solariella actinophora Dall, 1890: synonym of Calliotropis actinophora (Dall, 1890)
- Solariella aeglees Watson, 1879: synonym of Calliotropis aeglees (Watson, 1879)
- Solariella affinis (Friele, 1877): synonym of Solariella amabilis (Jeffreys, 1865)
- Solariella agulhasensis Thiele, 1925: synonym of Ilanga agulhaensis (Thiele, 1925)
- Solariella algoensis Thiele, 1925: synonym of Pseudominolia articulata (Gould, 1861)
- Solariella amabilis auct. non Jeffreys, 1865: synonym of Lamellitrochus incerinatus Quinn, 1991
- Solariella ambigua Dautzenberg & H. Fischer, 1896: synonym of Calliotropis ambigua (Dautzenberg & Fischer, 1896)
- Solariella anoxia Dall, 1927: synonym of Echinogurges anoxius (Dall, 1927)
- Solariella aquamarina Melvill, J.C., 1909: synonym of Ilanga aquamarina (Melvill, 1909)
- Solariella asperrima (Dall, 1881): synonym of Dentistyla asperrima (Dall, 1881)
- Solariella basilica Marshall, 1999: synonym of Spectamen basilicum (Marshall, 1999)
- Solariella beckeri G.B. Sowerby, 1892: synonym of Solariella fuscomaculata G.B. Sowerby, 1892
- Solariella benthicola (Powell, 1937): synonym of Spectamen benthicola (Powell, 1937)
- Solariella biradiatula Martens, 1902: synonym of Ilanga biradiatula (Martens, 1902)
- Solariella calatha Dall, 1927: synonym of Calliotropis calatha (Dall, 1927)
- Solariella cancapae Vilvens & Swinnen, 2007: synonym of Lamellitrochus cancapae (Vilvens & Swinnen, 2007)
- Solariella callomphala Schepman, 1908: synonym of Bathymophila callomphala (Schepman, 1908)
- Solariella canaliculata Dollfus, 1911: synonym of Lirularia canaliculata (E.A. Smith, 1871)
- Solariella ceratophora Dall, 1896: synonym of Calliotropis ceratophora (Dall, 1896)
- Solariella chuni Thiele, 1925: synonym of Solariella intermissa Thiele, 1925
- Solariella clavatus Watson, 1879: synonym of Echinogurges clavatus (Watson, 1879)
- Solariella constricta Dall, 1927: synonym of Haloceras carinata (Jeffreys, 1883)
- Solariella constricta auct. non Dall, 1927: synonym of Haloceras trichotropoides Warén & Bouchet, 1991
- Solariella corbis Dall, 1889: synonym of Mirachelus corbis (Dall, 1889)
- Solariella dentifera Dall, 1889: synonym of Dentistyla dentifera (Dall, 1889)
- Solariella dereimsi Dollfus, 1911: synonym of Lirularia dereimsi (Dollfus, 1911)
- Solariella dilecta (Sowerby III, 1899): synonym of Pseudominolia articulata (Gould, 1861)
- Solariella durbanensis Kilburn, 1977: synonym of Ethminolia durbanensis (Kilburn, 1977)
- Solariella effossima Locard, 1898: synonym of Calliotropis effossima (Locard, 1898)
- Solariella euteia Vilvens, 2009: synonym of Spectamen euteium (Vilvens, 2009) (original combination)
- Solariella exigua Locard, 1898: synonym of Spectamen exiguum (B. A. Marshall, 1999)
- Solariella fera Bagirov, 1995: synonym of Solariella margaritifera (Okutani, 1964)
- Solariella flavida B. A. Marshall, 1999: synonym of Spectamen flavidum (B. A. Marshall, 1999) (original combination)
- Solariella franciscana Barnard, 1963: synonym of Spectamen franciscanum (Barnard, 1963)
- Solariella gilchristi Barnard, 1963: synonym of Solariella intermissa Thiele, 1925
- Solariella gilvosplendens Melvill, 1891: synonym of Minolia gilvosplendens Melvill, 1891
- Solariella gratiosa Thiele, 1925: synonym of Ilanga gratiosa (Thiele, 1925)
- Solariella hondoensis Dall, 1919: synonym of Calliotropis hondoensis (Dall, 1919)
- Solariella hurleyi Marshall, 1979: synonym of Archiminolia hurleyi (B. A. Marshall, 1979)
- Solariella illustris Sturany, 1904: synonym of Ilanga illustris (Sturany, 1904)
- Solariella incisura Melvill, 1909: synonym of Ilanga incisura (Melvill, 1909)
- Solariella infundibulum (Watson, 1879): synonym of Calliotropis infundibulum(Watson, 1879)
- Soraliella inoptanda (Locard, 1897): synonym of Solariella cincta (Philippi, 1836)
- Solariella iridescens Habe, 1968: synonym of Microgaza iridescens (Habe, 1968)
- Solariella intermissa Thiele, 1925: synonym of Zetela semisculpta (Martens, 1904)
- Solariella koreanica Dall, 1919: synonym of Margarites koreanicus (Dall, 1919)
- Solariella laevissima (Martens, 1881): synonym of Ilanga laevissima (Martens, 1881)
- Solariella lamellosa auct. non Verrill & Smith, 1880: synonym of Lamellitrochus inceratus Quinn, 1991
- Solariella lamellosus (Dall, 1881) - lamellose solarelle: synonym of Lamellitrochus lamellosus (Verrill & S. Smith, 1880)
- Solariella lewisae (Dall, 1881): synonym of Solariella obscura (Couthouy, 1838)
- Solariella lissocona (Dall, 1881): synonym of Calliotropis lissocona (Dall, 1881)
- Solariella lubrica Dall, 1881: synonym of Suavotrochus lubricus (Dall, 1881)
- Solariella luteola (Powell, 1937): synonym of Spectamen luteolum (Powell, 1937)
- Solariella macleari Barnard, 1963: synonym of Solariella intermissa Thiele, 1925
- Solariella meyeri Kilburn, 1973: synonym of Ilanga biradiatula (Martens, 1902)
- Solariella micans Dautzenberg & H. Fischer, 1896: synonym of Bathymophila micans (Dautzenberg & H. Fischer, 1896)
- Solariella mogadorensis Locard, 1898: synonym of Calliotropis mogadorensis (Locard, 1898)
- Solariella multilirata Odhner, N.H.J., 1912: synonym of Solariella obscura (Couthouy, 1838)
- Solariella multistriata Barnard, 1963: synonym of Ilanga agulhaensis (Thiele, 1925)
- Solariella multistriata Thiele, 1925: synonym of Spectamen multistriatum (Thiele, 1925)
- Solariella mutabilis Schepman, 1908: synonym of Spectamen mutabilis (Schepman, 1908)
- Solariella nektonica Okutani, 1961: synonym of Ethminolia nektonica (Okutani, 1961)
- Solariella nitens Thiele, 1925: synonym of Ilanga laevissima (Martens, 1881)
- Solariella nuda Dall, 1896: synonym of Chonospeira nuda (Dall, 1896)
- Solariella nyssonus Dall, 1919: synonym of Minolia nyssonus (Dall, 1919)
- Solariella olivaceostrigata Schepman, 1908: synonym of Archiminolia olivaceostrigata (Schepman, 1908)
- Solariella opalina Shikama & Hayashi, 1977: synonym of Microgaza opalina (Shikama & Hayashi, 1977)
- † Solariella ordo (Laws, 1941): synonym of † Spectamen ordo (Laws, 1941) (superseded combination)
- Solariella ornatissima (Schepman, 1908): synonym of Ethminolia ornatissima (Schepman, 1908)
- Solariella oxybasis Dall, 1890: synonym of Bathybembix bairdii (Dall, 1889)
- Solariella oxycona E.A. Smith, 1899: synonym of Calliotropis oxycona (E. A. Smith, 1899)
- Solariella peramabilis Carpenter, 1864: synonym of Minolia peramabilis Carpenter, 1864
- Solariella plicatula (Murdoch & Suter, 1906): synonym of Spectamen plicatulum (Murdoch & Suter, 1906)
- Solariella pourtalesi Clench & Aguayo, 1939: synonym of Lamellitrochus pourtalesi (Clench & Aguayo, 1939)
- Solariella pseudobscura Yokoyama, 1927: synonym of Minolia pseudobscura (Yokoyama, 1927)
- Solariella pulchella Turton, 1932: synonym of Solariella fuscomaculata G.B. Sowerby, 1892
- Solariella quadricincta Quinn, 1992: synonym of Solariella carvalhoi Lopes & Cardoso, 1958
- Solariella regalis (Verrill & S. Smith, 1880): synonym of Calliotropis regalis (Verrill & Smith, 1880)
- Solariella rhina (Watson, 1886): synonym of Calliotropis rhina (Watson, 1886)
- Solariella rhyssa Dall, 1919: synonym of Solariella peramabilis Carpenter, 1864
- Solariella rudecta (Locard, 1898): synonym of Calliotropis rudecta (Locard, 1898)
- Solariella rufanensis Turton, 1932: synonym of Solariella fuscomaculata G.B. Sowerby, 1892
- Solariella sculpta G.B. Sowerby, 1897: synonym of Ethminolia sculpta (G.B. Sowerby, 1897)
- Solariella semisculpta (Martens, 1904): synonym of Spectamen semisculptum (Martens, 1904)
- Solariella sericifila (Dall, 1889): synonym of Dentistyla sericifilum (Dall, 1889)
- Solariella semireticulata (Suter, 1908): synonym of Spectamen semireticulatum (Suter, 1908)
- Solariella splendens Sowerby, 1897: synonym of Pseudominolia splendens (G.B. Sowerby, 1897)
- Solariella staminea Quinn, 1992: synonym of Solariella carvalhoi Lopes & Cardoso, 1958
- Solariella stearnsi (Pilsbry, 1895): synonym of Ethminolia stearnsii (Pilsbry, 1895): synonym of Sericominolia stearnsii (Pilsbry, 1895)
- Solariella talismani Locard, 1898: synonym of Calliotropis talismani (Locard, 1898)
- Solariella textilis (Murdoch & Suter, 1906): synonym of Zetela textilis (Murdoch & Suter, 1906)
- Solariella tiara (Watson, 1879): synonym of Calliotropis tiara (Watson, 1879)
- Solariella tiara auct. non Watson, 1879: synonym of Lamellitrochus lamellosus (Verrill & Smith, 1880)
- Solariella tragema Melvill & Standen, 1896: synonym of Vanitrochus tragema (Melvill & Standen, 1896)
- Solariella tryphenensis (Powell, 1930): synonym of Spectamen tryphenense (Powell, 1930)
- Solariella tuberculata Bagirov, 1995: synonym of Solariella delicata Dall, 1919
- Solariella turbynei Barnard, 1963: synonym of Spectamen turbynei (Barnard, 1963)
- Solariella tubulata Dall, 1927: synonym of Echinogurges tubulatus (Dall, 1927)
- Solariella undata Sowerby, 1870: synonym of Ilanga undata (G.B. Sowerby, 1870)
- Solariella vaillanti (P. Fischer, 1882): synonym of Calliotropis vaillanti (P. Fischer, 1882)
- Solariella valdiviae Thiele, 1925: synonym of Ilanga undata undata (G.B. Sowerby, 1870)
- Solariella valida Dautzenberg & H. Fischer, 1896: synonym of Calliotropis valida (Dautzenberg & Fischer, 1906)
- Solariella variabilis (Dell, 1956): synonym of Zetela variabilis Dell, 1956
- † Solariella venusta (P. A. Maxwell, 1969): synonym of † Spectamen venustum (P. A. Maxwell, 1969)
- Solariella vera (Powell, 1937): synonym of Spectamen verum (Powell, 1937)
- Solariella zacalles Melvill & Standen, 1903: synonym of Archiminolia zacalles (Melvill & Standen, 1903)
- Solariella zacalloides Schepman, 1908: synonym of Microgaza fulgens Dall, 1907

Incertae sedis

  - Solariella mutabilis var laevior Schepman, 1908
  - Solariella mutabilis var. plicifera Schepman, 1908

Species inquirenda

- Solariella fuscomaculata G.B. Sowerby, 1892
- Solariella humillima Thiele, 1925
- Solariella turritellina Ancey, 1881

The Indo-Pacific Molluscan Database also includes the following species with names in current use:

- Solariella baxteri McLean, 1995
- Solariella marginata Schepman, 1908
- Solariella oxycona Smith, 1899

Subgenus Solariella Wood, 1842

- Solariella bellula Melvill & Standen
- Solariella deliciosa Preston, 1916
- Solariella dulcissima Preston, 1908

Other species within the genus Solariella include:

- Solariella laevis Friele, 1886 - smooth solarelle
- Solariella maculata S. V. Wood, 1842
- Solariella margaritus
- Solariella scabriuscula (Dall, 1881)
