= Solariella nanshaensis =

Scientific classification
- Kingdom: Animalia
- Phylum: Mollusca
- Class: Gastropoda
- Subclass: Vetigastropoda
- Order: Trochida
- Superfamily: Trochoidea
- Family: Solariellidae
- Genus: Solariella
- Species: S. nanshaensis

Binomial name
- Solariella nanshaensis Zhengzhi, 2002

Species of gastropod

Solariella nanshaensis is a species of sea snail, a marine gastropod mollusk in the family Solariellidae.
