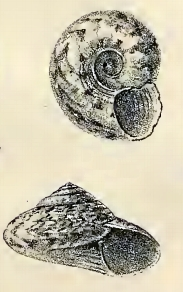
- Original drawing with two views of a shell of Solariella zacalles

Scientific classification
- Kingdom: Animalia
- Phylum: Mollusca
- Class: Gastropoda
- Subclass: Vetigastropoda
- Order: Trochida
- Superfamily: Trochoidea
- Family: Solariellidae
- Genus: Solariella
- Species: S. zacalles

Binomial name
- Solariella zacalles Melvill 1903

Synonyms
- Archiminolia zacalles Melvill & Standen, 1903

= Solariella zacalles =

Species of mollusc

Solariella zacalles is a species of sea snail, a marine gastropod mollusk in the family Solariellidae.

== Description ==
The height of the shell attains 4 mm, its diameter is 9 mm. The solid shell has a depressed conical shape and is deeply umbilicate. It contains six whorls. The oblique aperture is almost round and has a thin lip.

== Distribution ==
This marine species in the Gulf of Oman and in the Persian Gulf.
