= Solariella antarctica =

Scientific classification
- Kingdom: Animalia
- Phylum: Mollusca
- Class: Gastropoda
- Subclass: Vetigastropoda
- Order: Trochida
- Superfamily: Trochoidea
- Family: Solariellidae
- Genus: Solariella
- Species: S. antarctica

Binomial name
- Solariella antarctica Powell, 1958

Species of gastropod

Solariella antarctica is a species of sea snail, a marine gastropod mollusk in the family Solariellidae.

== Description ==
The size of the shell attains 6 mm.

== Distribution ==
This species occurs in Antarctic waters.
