= Solariella brychia =

Scientific classification
- Kingdom: Animalia
- Phylum: Mollusca
- Class: Gastropoda
- Subclass: Vetigastropoda
- Order: Trochida
- Superfamily: Trochoidea
- Family: Solariellidae
- Genus: Solariella
- Species: S. brychia

Binomial name
- Solariella brychia (R. B. Watson, 1879)

Synonyms
- Trochus (Margarita) brychius R. B. Watson, 1879; Trochus brychius R. B. Watson, 1879

Species of gastropod

Solariella brychia is a species of sea snail, a marine gastropod mollusk, in the family Solariellidae.
