= Solariella patriae =

Scientific classification
- Kingdom: Animalia
- Phylum: Mollusca
- Class: Gastropoda
- Subclass: Vetigastropoda
- Order: Trochida
- Superfamily: Trochoidea
- Family: Solariellidae
- Genus: Solariella
- Species: S. patriae

Binomial name
- Solariella patriae Carcelles, 1953

Species of gastropod

Solariella patriae is a species of sea snail, a marine gastropod mollusk in the family Solariellidae.

== Description ==
The size of the shell attains 9 mm.

== Distribution ==
This species occurs in the Atlantic Ocean off Eastern Brazil and Argentina at depths between 15 m and 180 m.
