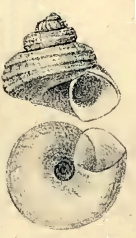
- Drawing with two views of a shell of Solariella obscura

Scientific classification
- Kingdom: Animalia
- Phylum: Mollusca
- Class: Gastropoda
- Subclass: Vetigastropoda
- Order: Trochida
- Superfamily: Trochoidea
- Family: Solariellidae
- Genus: Solariella
- Species: S. obscura

Binomial name
- Solariella obscura (Couthouy, 1838)

Synonyms
- Ilanga carinata Verrill, A.E., 1882; Ilanga planula Verrill, A.E., 1882; Machaeroplax albula (Gould, 1861); Machaeroplax bella (Verkrüzen, 1875); Machaeroplax carinata A. E. Verrill, 1882; Machaeroplax obscura (Couthouy, 1838); Machaeroplax planula A. E. Verrill, 1882; Margarita bella Verkrüzen, 1875; Margarita islandica Odhner, N.H.J., 1910; Margarites albula Gould, A.A., 1861; Margarita cinereaeformis Leche, W., 1878; Margarita intermedia Leche, W., 1878; Margarita islandica Odhner, 1910; Solariella laevis Friele, 1886; Solariella lewisae Willett, 1946; Solariella multilirata Odhner, N.H.J., 1912; Turbo obscurus Couthouy, 1838 (original combination)

= Solariella obscura =

Species of gastropod

Solariella obscura, common name the obscure solarelle, is a species of sea snail, a marine gastropod mollusk in the family Solariellidae.

== Distribution ==
This marine species occurs circum-Arctic, in the Northern Pacific Ocean and in the Northern Atlantic Ocean

== Description ==
The maximum recorded shell length is 8.9 mm.

The thin, umbilicate shell has a conical shape. It is ashen, whitish or reddish in color. The surface is lusterless, the dull outer layer very thin, overlying a brilliantly iridescent nacre. The sculpture consists of a rather prominent spiral ridge or carina at the shoulder of each whorl, beneath which, on the peripheral portion of the whorl, there are several (generally 3 to 6) smaller lirae, often subobsolete. The entire base sometimes shows fine low concentric lirae, but usually they nearly disappear there, becoming visible again around the umbilicus. There are often traces of a few obscure spiral riblets above the supra-peripheral carina. Longitudinally the entire surface is marked by regular. rather close waves or folds, so low and obtuse as to be frequently almost indistinguishable. The spire is conical. The apex is rather blunt. The apical whorl is rather prominent, reddish, corneous or purplish, smooth and rounded. The suture is impressed. The 5½ whorls are convex and tubular. The body whorl is slightly convex beneath and carinated around the umbilicus. The aperture is oblique, and circular. Its margins are thin and arcuate. There is a slight angle at the base of the columellar lip.

== Habitat ==
Minimum recorded depth is 5 m. Maximum recorded depth is 878 m. It is commonly found on soft sediments, continental slopes, and cold-water benthic zones.

== Ecology ==
Like many deep-sea gastropods, Solariella obscura is believed to be detritivores or micro grazer, feeding on organic matter, bacteria, and microalgae on the seafloor. It may also play a role in nutrient cycling within its ecosystem by breaking down organic particles.

== Reproduction ==
specific data on the reproduction behavior or S.obscura is lacking. However, members of the Solariellidae family typically reproduce via external fertilization, releasing eggs and sperm into water column. Larvae are planktonic, undergoing several stages of development before settling on the seafloor and metamorphosing into juveniles.
