= Solariella lusitanica =

Scientific classification
- Kingdom: Animalia
- Phylum: Mollusca
- Class: Gastropoda
- Subclass: Vetigastropoda
- Order: Trochida
- Superfamily: Trochoidea
- Family: Solariellidae
- Genus: Solariella
- Species: S. lusitanica

Binomial name
- Solariella lusitanica (P. Fischer, 1887)

Synonyms
- Trochus (Solariella) lusitanicus Fischer P. 1882

Species of gastropod

Solariella lusitanica is a species of sea snail, a marine gastropod mollusk in the family Solariellidae.

== Distribution ==
This species occurs in European waters off Portugal.
