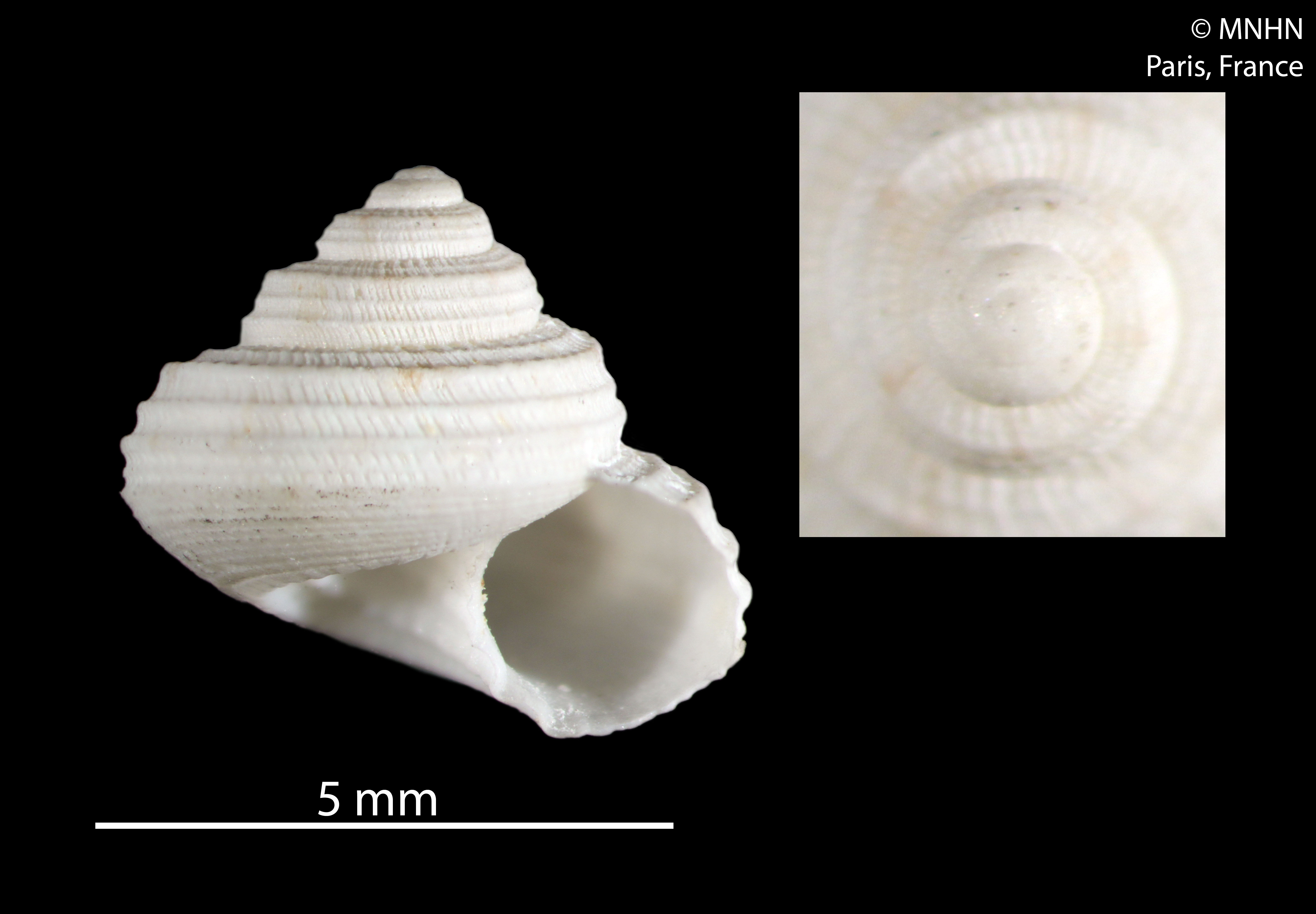
- Shell of Solariella carvalhoi (paratype at MNHN, Paris)

Scientific classification
- Kingdom: Animalia
- Phylum: Mollusca
- Class: Gastropoda
- Subclass: Vetigastropoda
- Order: Trochida
- Superfamily: Trochoidea
- Family: Solariellidae
- Genus: Solariella
- Species: S. carvalhoi

Binomial name
- Solariella carvalhoi Lopes & Cardoso, 1958

Synonyms
- Solariella quadricincta; Solariella staminea

= Solariella carvalhoi =

Species of gastropod

Solariella carvalhoi is a species of sea snail, a marine gastropod mollusk in the family Solariellidae.

== Description ==
The maximum recorded shell length is 7 mm.

== Distribution ==
This species occurs in the Caribbean Sea, the Gulf of Mexico, and the Atlantic Ocean off Brazil.

== Habitat ==
Minimum recorded depth is 0 m. Maximum recorded depth is 66 m.
