= Solariella periscopia =

Scientific classification
- Kingdom: Animalia
- Phylum: Mollusca
- Class: Gastropoda
- Subclass: Vetigastropoda
- Order: Trochida
- Superfamily: Trochoidea
- Family: Solariellidae
- Genus: Solariella
- Species: S. periscopia

Binomial name
- Solariella periscopia Dall, 1927

Species of gastropod

Solariella periscopia is a species of sea snail, a marine gastropod mollusk in the family Solariellidae. It is commonly referred to as the "look-around solarelle", and was first described in 1927.

== Distribution ==
This species occurs in the Western Atlantic Ocean (North Carolina, the Bahamas), the Caribbean Sea and the Gulf of Mexico.

== Description ==
The maximum recorded shell length is 3 mm.

== Habitat ==
Minimum recorded depth is 46 m. Maximum recorded depth is 95 m.
