= Solariella marginulata =

Scientific classification
- Kingdom: Animalia
- Phylum: Mollusca
- Class: Gastropoda
- Subclass: Vetigastropoda
- Order: Trochida
- Superfamily: Trochoidea
- Family: Solariellidae
- Genus: Solariella
- Species: †S. marginulata

Binomial name
- †Solariella marginulata (Philippi, 1844)

Synonyms
- Solarium nitidum Aradas, 1846; Trochus marginulatus Philippi, 1844

Extinct species of gastropod

Solariella marginulata is an extinct species of sea snail, a marine gastropod mollusk, in the family Solariellidae.
