= Solariella delicata =

Scientific classification
- Kingdom: Animalia
- Phylum: Mollusca
- Class: Gastropoda
- Subclass: Vetigastropoda
- Order: Trochida
- Superfamily: Trochoidea
- Family: Solariellidae
- Genus: Solariella
- Species: S. delicatus

Binomial name
- Solariella delicatus Dall, 1919

Synonyms
- Machaeroplax delicates (Dall, 1919); Solariella tuberculata Bagirov, 1995

Species of gastropod

Solariella delicatus is a species of sea snail, a marine gastropod mollusk in the family Solariellidae.

== Description ==
(Original description by W.H. Dall) The height of the shell attains 7 mm, its diameter 6.5 mm. The small, white shell has about four well rounded whorls exclusive of the rather promment minute glassy nucleus. The suture is distinct, almost appressed. The spiral sculpture shows a prominent thread at the shoulder, two with an intercala smaller thread at the verge of the umbilicus and numerous feeble minute elevated lines under-running the axial sculpture. The umbilicus is narrow and deep. The axial sculpture consists of very numerous, equal, regularly spaced low lamellae, with (on the body whorl) about equal interspaces, extending to the verge of the umbilicus and minutely beading the shoulder cord. The circular aperture is hardly interrupted by the body. The margins are thin and sharp.

== Distribution ==
This marine species occurs off the Philippines, Japan and the Kuriles.
