= Solariella cancilla =

Scientific classification
- Kingdom: Animalia
- Phylum: Mollusca
- Class: Gastropoda
- Subclass: Vetigastropoda
- Order: Trochida
- Superfamily: Trochoidea
- Family: Solariellidae
- Genus: Solariella
- Species: S. cancilla

Binomial name
- Solariella cancilla Dall, 1927

Species of gastropod

Solariella cancilla is a species of sea snail, a marine gastropod mollusk in the family Solariellidae. The size of the shell attains 3.5 mm. This species occurs in the Atlantic Ocean off Georgia, USA, at depths between 538 m and 805 m.

== Description ==
The size of the shell attains 3.5 mm.

== Distribution ==
This species occurs in the Atlantic Ocean off Georgia, USA, at depths between 538 m and 805 m.
