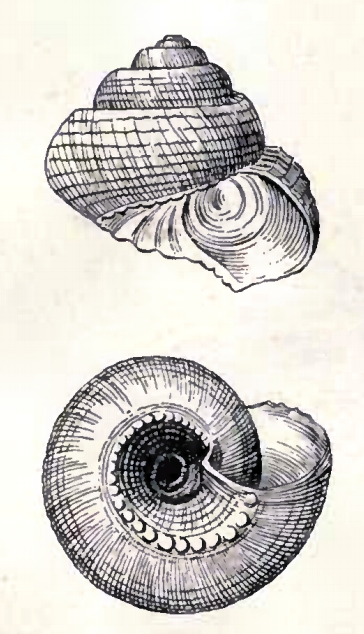
- Original drawing with two views of a shell of Solariella iris

Scientific classification
- Kingdom: Animalia
- Phylum: Mollusca
- Class: Gastropoda
- Subclass: Vetigastropoda
- Order: Trochida
- Superfamily: Trochoidea
- Family: Solariellidae
- Genus: Solariella
- Species: S. iris

Binomial name
- Solariella iris (Dall, 1881)

Synonyms
- Margarita iris Dall, 1881

= Solariella iris =

Species of gastropod

Solariella iris is a species of sea snail, a marine gastropod mollusk in the family Solariellidae.

== Distribution ==
This species occurs in the Gulf of Mexico off the Florida Keys at depths between 218 m and 402 m.

== Description ==
The maximum recorded shell height is 5 mm, its diameter 5.5 mm.

(Original description by W.H. Dall) The thin shell is brilliantly nacreous. it is inflated and has a depressed-conical shape with five whorls. The spire is obtuse. The nucleus is polished, smooth, and very minute. The remainder of the shell is sculptured with fine revolving lines, subequal, about as wide as the interspaces, about eighteen at the beginning of the body whorl. These are crossed by slight plications, beginning near the suture, becoming nodulous on a single prominent thread a little way from the suture (which is thus made to appear somewhat channelled), becoming faint about the middle of the upper side of the whorl, and entirely disappearing before reaching the periphery. The revolving lines are fainter on the rounded base. The umbilicus is wide and funnel-shaped, bordered by a strong keel with about twenty-five rounded nodules. The inner walls of the umbilicus show strong revolving lines delicately reticulated by the lines of growth. The whorls are rounded, with no carina at the periphery. The thin columella is arched, not reflected. The aperture is nearly round, but angulated above by the sutural thread, and below by the umbilical keel. The edges are simple, not thickened. The thin operculum is corneous and multispiral. The shell is nacreous, with delicate suffused splashes of brown.

== Habitat ==
Minimum recorded depth is 218 m. Maximum recorded depth is 402 m.
