= Solariella varicosa =

Scientific classification
- Kingdom: Animalia
- Phylum: Mollusca
- Class: Gastropoda
- Subclass: Vetigastropoda
- Order: Trochida
- Superfamily: Trochoidea
- Family: Solariellidae
- Genus: Solariella
- Species: S. varicosa

Binomial name
- Solariella varicosa (Mighels & Adams, 1842)

Synonyms
- Machaeroplax paupercula (Dall, 1919); Machaeroplax varicosa (Mighels & Adams, 1842); Margarita acuminata Mighels & Adams, 1842; Margarita elegantissima S. V. Wood, 1848; Margarita polaris Danielssen, 1859; Margarita varicosa Mighels & Adams, 1842 (original combination); Margarites pauperculus Dall, 1919

Species of gastropod

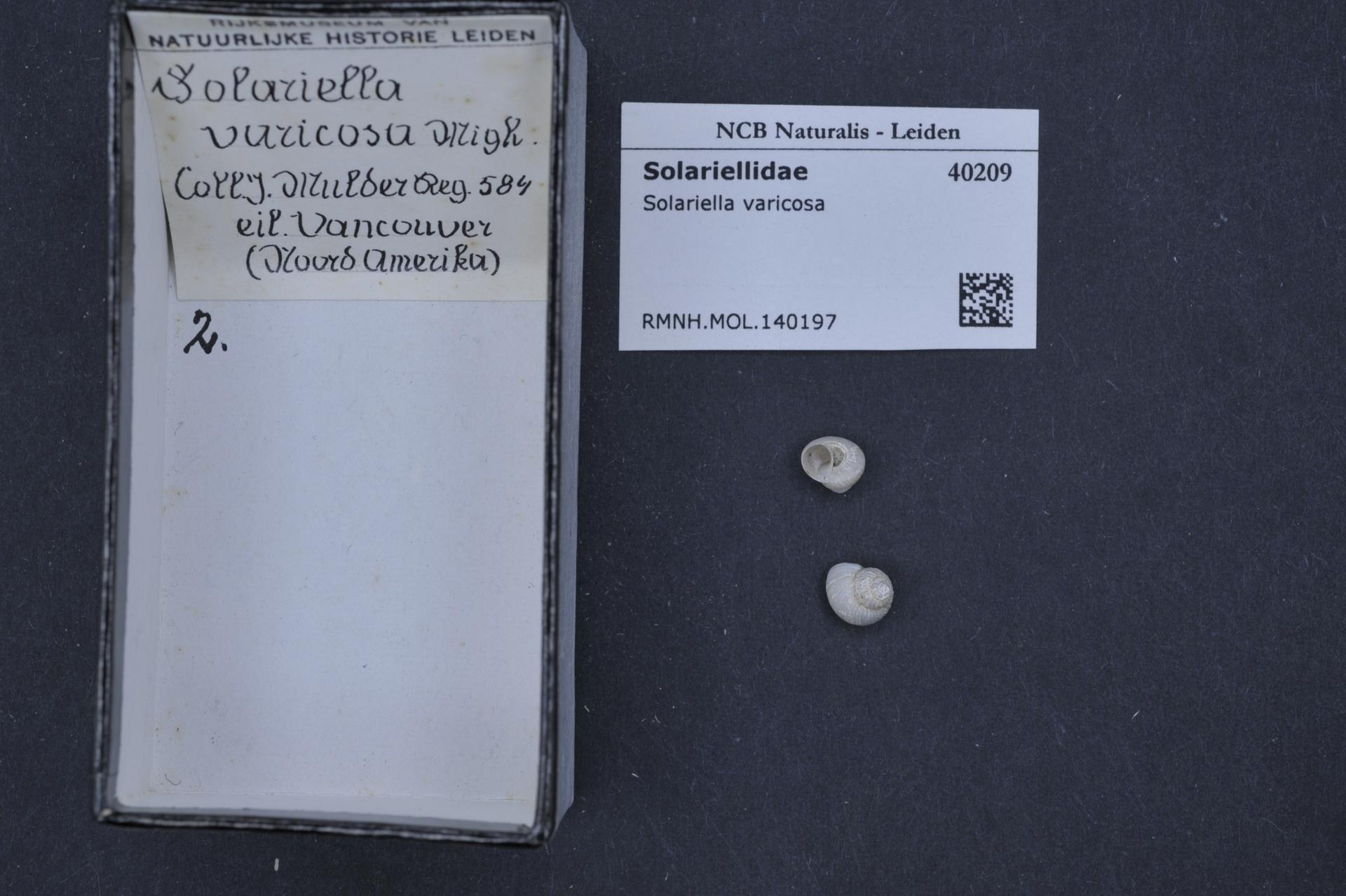

Solariella varicosa, common name the varicose solarielle, is a species of sea snail, a marine gastropod mollusk in the family Solariellidae.

== Distribution ==
This species occurs in European waters, in the northwest Atlantic Ocean, in circum-arctic waters, in the Pacific Ocean from Alaska to southern California.

== Description ==
The maximum recorded shell length is 14 mm. The shell is coarse, usually more or less eroded. It has a yellowish white color over a brilliant nacre. The spire contains with five or more moderately rounded whorls. The nucleus is eroded. The distinct suture is not appressed. The axial sculpture shows numerous somewhat irregular narrow close-set wrinkles, extending over the whorl from the suture to the verge of the funicular umbilicus. The spiral sculpture shows a few spiral lines near the umbilicus. The subcircular aperture is oblique and produced above. The lips are joined over the body by a layer of enamel. The dark-brown operculum is multispiral, with 8 or 10 turns.

== Habitat ==
Minimum recorded depth is 13 m. Maximum recorded depth is 393 m.
