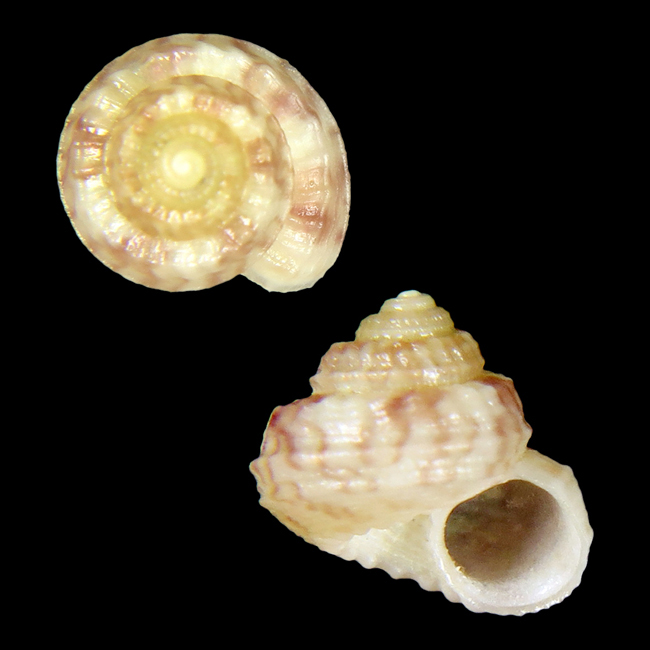

Scientific classification
- Kingdom: Animalia
- Phylum: Mollusca
- Class: Gastropoda
- Subclass: Vetigastropoda
- Order: Trochida
- Superfamily: Trochoidea
- Family: Solariellidae
- Genus: Solariella
- Species: S. dedonderorum

Binomial name
- Solariella dedonderorum (Poppe, Tagaro & Dekker, 2006)

Synonyms
- Zetela dedonderorum Poppe, Tagaro & Dekker, 2006 (original combination)

= Solariella dedonderorum =

Species of gastropod

Solariella dedonderorum is a species of sea snail, a marine gastropod mollusk in the family of Solariellidae.

== Description ==
The size of the shell varies between 2.6 mm to 5 mm.

== Distribution ==
This marine species occurs off the coast of Philippines.
