= Solariella lupe =

Scientific classification
- Kingdom: Animalia
- Phylum: Mollusca
- Class: Gastropoda
- Subclass: Vetigastropoda
- Order: Trochida
- Superfamily: Trochoidea
- Family: Solariellidae
- Genus: Solariella
- Species: S. lupe

Binomial name
- Solariella lupe Rolan, Hernandez & Deniz, 2005

Species of gastropod

Solariella lupe is a species of sea snail, a marine gastropod mollusk in the family Solariellidae.

== Description ==
The size of the shell varies between 3 mm and 4.8 mm.

== Distribution ==
This species occurs in the Atlantic Ocean off Mauritania.
