= Solariella margaritifera =

Scientific classification
- Kingdom: Animalia
- Phylum: Mollusca
- Class: Gastropoda
- Subclass: Vetigastropoda
- Order: Trochida
- Superfamily: Trochoidea
- Family: Solariellidae
- Genus: Solariella
- Species: S. margaritifera

Binomial name
- Solariella margaritifera (Okutani, 1964)

Synonyms
- Margarites margaritiferus Okutani, 1964; Solariella fera Bagirov, 1995

Species of gastropod

Solariella margaritifera is a species of sea snail, a marine gastropod mollusk in the family Solariellidae.

== Distribution ==
This marine species occurs off Japan.
