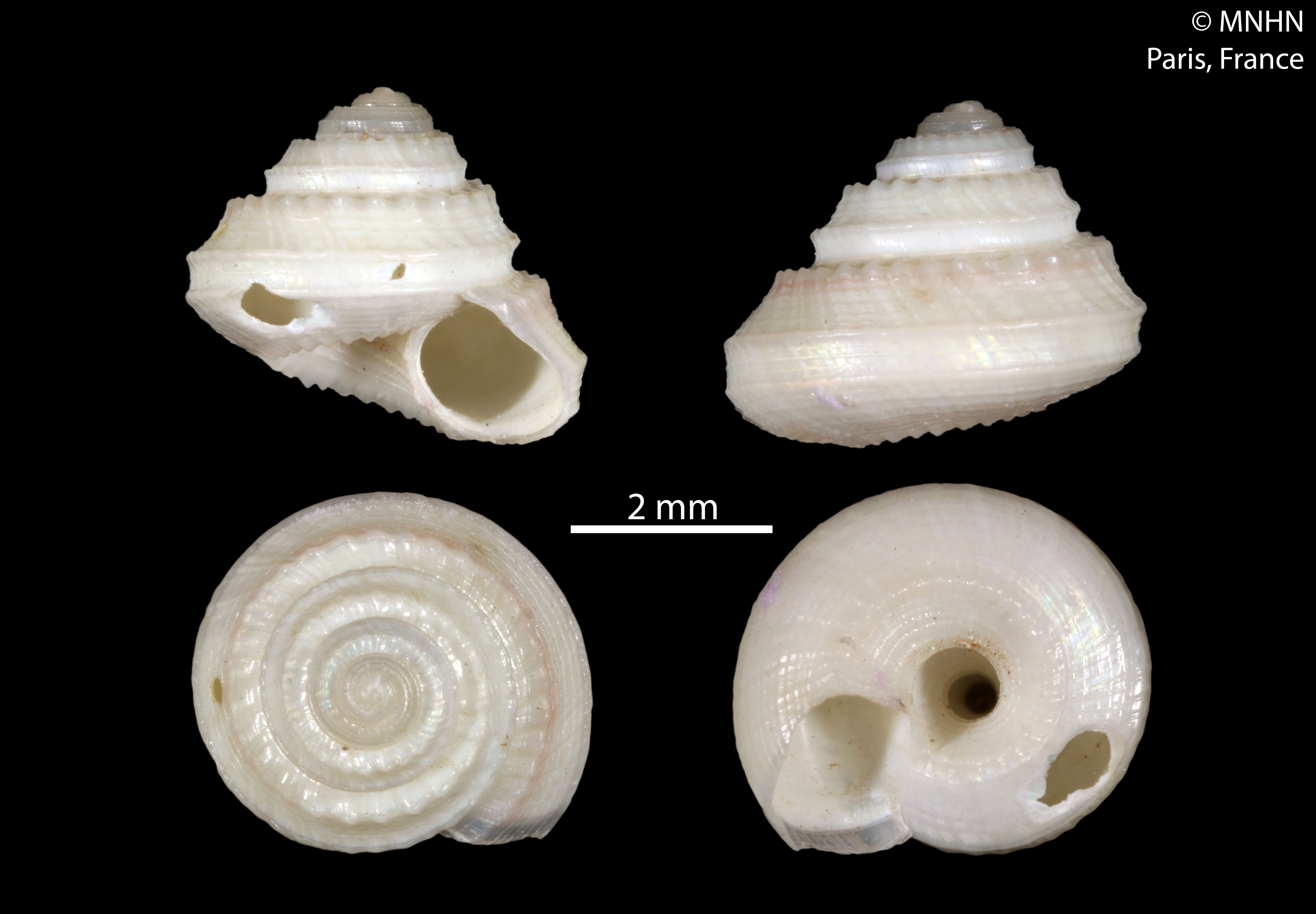
- Shell of Solariella plakhus (syntype at MNHN, Paris)

Scientific classification
- Kingdom: Animalia
- Phylum: Mollusca
- Class: Gastropoda
- Subclass: Vetigastropoda
- Order: Trochida
- Superfamily: Trochoidea
- Family: Solariellidae
- Genus: Solariella
- Species: S. plakhus

Binomial name
- Solariella plakhus Vilvens, 2009

= Solariella plakhus =

Species of gastropod

Solariella plakhus is a species of sea snail, a marine gastropod mollusk in the family Solariellidae.

== Distribution ==
This marine species occurs off Taiwan.
