= Solariella intermedia =

Scientific classification
- Kingdom: Animalia
- Phylum: Mollusca
- Class: Gastropoda
- Subclass: Vetigastropoda
- Order: Trochida
- Superfamily: Trochoidea
- Family: Solariellidae
- Genus: Solariella
- Species: S. intermedia

Binomial name
- Solariella intermedia (Leche, 1878)

Synonyms
- Margarita groenlandica intermedia Leche, 1878; Solariella obscura intermedia (Leche, 1878)

Species of gastropod

Solariella intermedia is a species of sea snail, a marine gastropod mollusk in the family Solariellidae.

== Distribution ==
This marine species occurs in circum-arctic waters.
