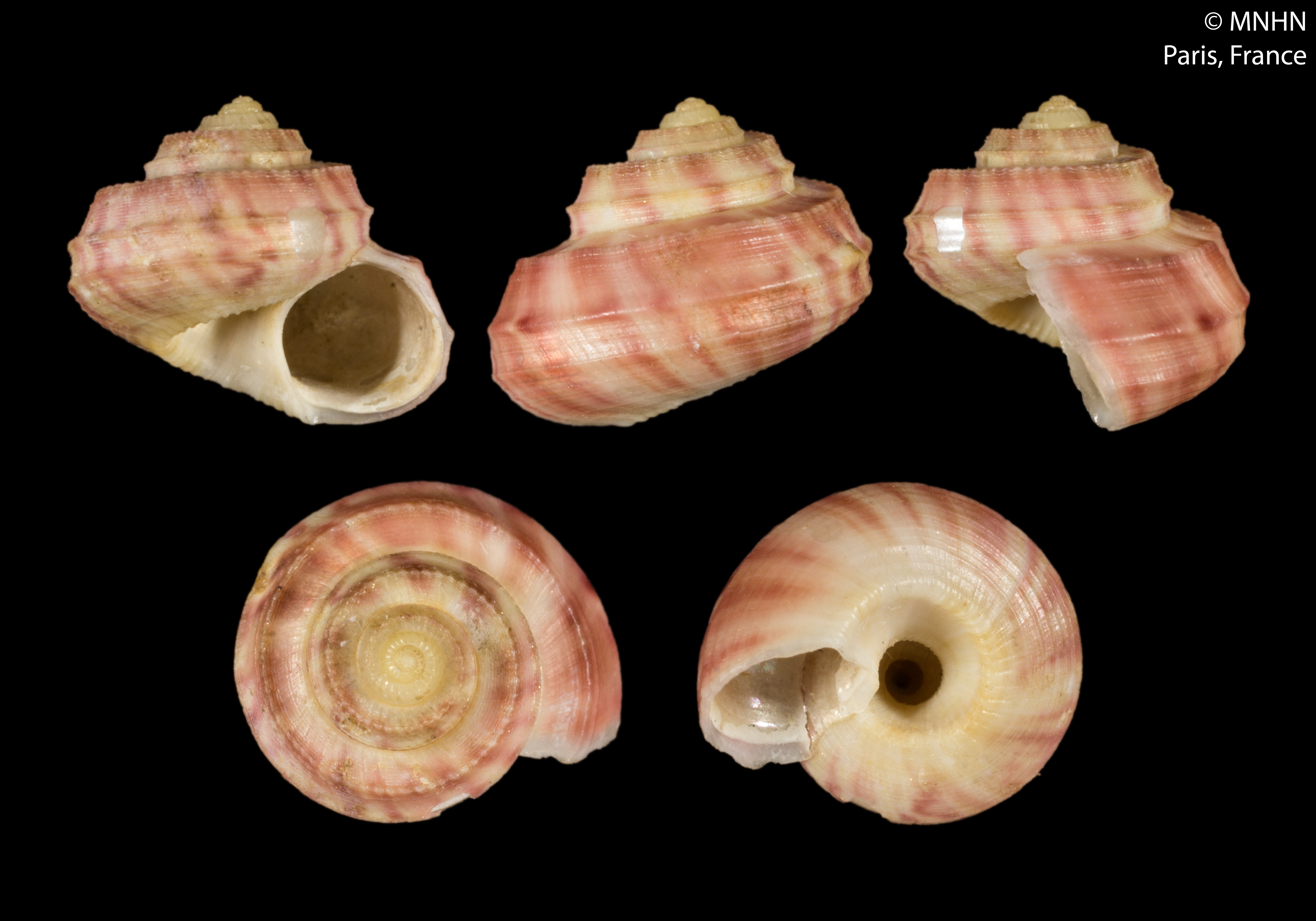
- Shell of Solariella cincta (syntype at MNHN, Paris)

Scientific classification
- Kingdom: Animalia
- Phylum: Mollusca
- Class: Gastropoda
- Subclass: Vetigastropoda
- Order: Trochida
- Superfamily: Trochoidea
- Family: Solariellidae
- Genus: Solariella
- Species: S. cincta

Binomial name
- Solariella cincta (Philippi, 1836)

Synonyms
- Trochus cinctus Philippi, 1836

= Solariella cincta =

Species of gastropod

Solariella cincta is a species of sea snail, a marine gastropod mollusk in the family Solariellidae.

== Distribution ==
This species can be found in the Northern Atlantic and off the coasts of West Africa. In the past, during the Late Pliocene, it had a wider distribution and occurred as well in the Mediterranean as off the coast of present Spain and Portugal.
