= Solariella tenuicollaris =

Scientific classification
- Kingdom: Animalia
- Phylum: Mollusca
- Class: Gastropoda
- Subclass: Vetigastropoda
- Order: Trochida
- Superfamily: Trochoidea
- Family: Solariellidae
- Genus: Solariella
- Species: S. tenuicollaris

Binomial name
- Solariella tenuicollaris Golikov & Sirenko, 1998

Synonyms
- Ilanga nyssonoides "Kuroda, T. MS" Okutani, T.A., 1964 (nomen nudum)

Species of gastropod

Solariella tenuicollaris is a species of sea snail, a marine gastropod mollusk in the family Solariellidae.

== Description ==
The size of the shell varies between 4 mm and 7 mm.

== Distribution ==
This marine species occurs off the Kurile Islands, Russia.
