= Solariella diomedea =

Scientific classification
- Kingdom: Animalia
- Phylum: Mollusca
- Class: Gastropoda
- Subclass: Vetigastropoda
- Order: Trochida
- Superfamily: Trochoidea
- Family: Solariellidae
- Genus: Solariella
- Species: S. diomedea

Binomial name
- Solariella diomedea Dall, 1919

Species of mollusc

Solariella diomedea is a species of sea snail, a marine gastropod mollusk in the family Solariellidae.

== Description ==
(Original description by W.H. Dall) The size of the shell varies between 3 mm and 6 mm. The small, white shell has a subglobular nucleus and 3½ subsequent whorls. The deep suture is distinct. The spiral sculpture on the spire consists of four or five equally distributed and subequal small threads with wider interspaces and a narrow flattish space in front of the suture. The intercalary threads appear on the penultimate whorl and on the first half of the body whorl they become numerous, covering the whole surface uniformly, but a little coarser on the verge of the umbilicus which is moderately wide and deep. This sculpture becomes obsolete and the last quarter of the body whorl is perfectly smooth and polished. The axial sculpture consists of numerous retractively arcuate threads beginning at the suture and extending feebly to the periphery on the upper part of the spire, later becoming obsolete. The base of the shell is rounded. The aperture is subcircular, simple, and sharp. The lips are connected by a glaze on the body and not reflected.

== Distribution ==
This species occurs in the Pacific Ocean off the Galápagos Islands and off Cocos Island, Costa Rica
