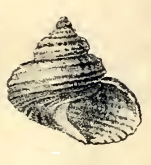
- Drawing of a shell of Solariella charopa

Scientific classification
- Kingdom: Animalia
- Phylum: Mollusca
- Class: Gastropoda
- Subclass: Vetigastropoda
- Order: Trochida
- Superfamily: Trochoidea
- Family: Solariellidae
- Genus: Solariella
- Species: S. charopa

Binomial name
- Solariella charopa (Watson, 1879)

Synonyms
- Trochus (Margarita) charopus Watson, 1879

= Solariella charopa =

Species of gastropod

Solariella charopa is a species of sea snail, a marine gastropod mollusk in the family Solariellidae.

== Description ==
The height of the shell is 1.95 cm (0.77-inch), its diameter 1.98 cm (0.78-inch). The thin, translucent, umbilicated shell has a globosely conical shape. It is banded and iridescent. The sculpture shows spiral threads numbering from twenty-five to thirty-five, sharply projecting, rounded, and fine on the body whorl. Of these, there are from three to seven feebler than the rest. Those on the base are continued within the aperture. The interstices are much broader than the threads. The whole surface is also fretted by microscopic spirals and stronger longitudinals, which follow the oblique lines of growth. Of the threads, six to thirteen appear on the penultimate whorl. They begin with the second whorl, and there the longitudinals are rather disproportionately strong and regular. The embryonic apex is faintly but coarsely tubercled.

The color of the shell is yellowish white, shot on the upper side with a dark iridescence. The spirals are black, clouded, and broken with oblique longitudinal streaks of white.

The spire is high and scalar. The apex, porcelanous and scarcely iridescent, is small, high, and mammillate, and consists of the one embryonic whorl, which is a little turned up on its side. The six whorls increase gradually and regularly in size. They are rounded, near the apex a little angulated by one of the spirals. The suture well marked, angulated, but not sharply so. The aperture is rather oblique, rounded, hardly angulated at the upper corner, not in the least descending, brilliantly iridescent within and showing the colored spirals of the outside. The outer lip is thin, slightly puckered at the spirals, a little thickened on the base. The inner lip is thickened and reflected, especially at its junction with the body where it almost covers the umbilicus. The columella is much curved, and thins gradually out to its junction with the base. The umbilicus is large and funnel-shaped on the base, deep, but small further in, contracted by a spiral white columellar pad, and more than half covered over by the columellar lip. The operculum is rather thin, horny, yellow, with ten or twelve very gradual turns, which are strongly defined by a thickened line. It is feebly marked with concentric and with radiating lines.

== Distribution ==
This marine species occurs off the Kerguelen Islands.
