= Solariella peristicta =

Scientific classification
- Kingdom: Animalia
- Phylum: Mollusca
- Class: Gastropoda
- Subclass: Vetigastropoda
- Order: Trochida
- Superfamily: Trochoidea
- Family: Solariellidae
- Genus: Solariella
- Species: S. peristicta

Binomial name
- Solariella peristicta Marshall, 1999

Species of gastropod

Solariella peristicta is a species of sea snail, a marine gastropod mollusk in the family Solariellidae.

== Distribution ==
This marine species is endemic to New Zealand and occurs off the Three Kings Islands at depths between 40 m and 805 m.
