= Solariella multirestis =

Scientific classification
- Kingdom: Animalia
- Phylum: Mollusca
- Class: Gastropoda
- Subclass: Vetigastropoda
- Order: Trochida
- Superfamily: Trochoidea
- Family: Solariellidae
- Genus: Solariella
- Species: S. multirestis

Binomial name
- Solariella multirestis Quinn, 1979

Species of gastropod

Solariella multirestis is a species of sea snail, a marine gastropod mollusk in the family Solariellidae.

== Distribution ==
This marine species occurs off St. Vincent, Lesser Antilles, at depths between 201 m and 251 m.

== Description ==
The maximum recorded shell length is 11.8 mm.

== Habitat ==
Minimum recorded depth is 201 m. Maximum recorded depth is 251 m.
