= Solariella susanae =

Scientific classification
- Kingdom: Animalia
- Phylum: Mollusca
- Class: Gastropoda
- Subclass: Vetigastropoda
- Order: Trochida
- Superfamily: Trochoidea
- Family: Solariellidae
- Genus: Solariella
- Species: †S. susanae

Binomial name
- †Solariella susanae Maxwell, 1988

Extinct species of gastropod

Solariella susanae is an extinct species of sea snail, a marine gastropod mollusk, in the family Solariellidae.

== Distribution ==
This species occurs in New Zealand.
