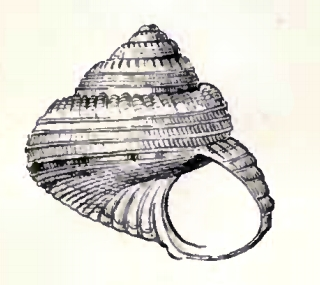
- Original drawing of a shell of Solariella lacunella

Scientific classification
- Kingdom: Animalia
- Phylum: Mollusca
- Class: Gastropoda
- Subclass: Vetigastropoda
- Order: Trochida
- Superfamily: Trochoidea
- Family: Solariellidae
- Genus: Solariella
- Species: S. lacunella

Binomial name
- Solariella lacunella (Dall, 1881)

Synonyms
- Margarita depressa Dall, 1889; Margarita lacunella Dall, 1881 (original description); Margarita maculata Dall, 1881 (preoccupied by a fossil species); Solariella lacunella var. depressa Dall, 1889

= Solariella lacunella =

Species of gastropod

Solariella lacunella, common name the channelled solarielle, is a species of sea snail, a marine gastropod mollusk in the family Solariellidae. This species occurs in the Caribbean Sea, the Gulf of Mexico and the Lesser Antilles; in the Atlantic Ocean off North Carolina and Florida at depths between 18 m and 1472 m.

== Description ==
The maximum recorded shell length is 8.7 mm.

== Habitat ==
Minimum recorded depth is 18 m. Maximum recorded depth is 1472 m.
