= Solariella bathyantarctica =

Scientific classification
- Kingdom: Animalia
- Phylum: Mollusca
- Class: Gastropoda
- Subclass: Vetigastropoda
- Order: Trochida
- Superfamily: Trochoidea
- Family: Solariellidae
- Genus: Solariella
- Species: S. bathyantarctica

Binomial name
- Solariella bathyantarctica Numanami, 1996

Species of gastropod

Solariella bathyantarctica is a species of sea snail, a marine gastropod mollusk in the family Solariellidae.

== Distribution ==
This species occurs in Antarctic waters.
