= Solariella marshalli =

Scientific classification
- Kingdom: Animalia
- Phylum: Mollusca
- Class: Gastropoda
- Subclass: Vetigastropoda
- Order: Trochida
- Superfamily: Trochoidea
- Family: Solariellidae
- Genus: Solariella
- Species: †S. marshalli

Binomial name
- †Solariella marshalli (Maxwell, 1992)

Extinct species of gastropod

Solariella marshalli is an extinct species of sea snail, a marine gastropod mollusk, in the family Solariellidae.

== Distribution ==
This species occurs in New Zealand.
