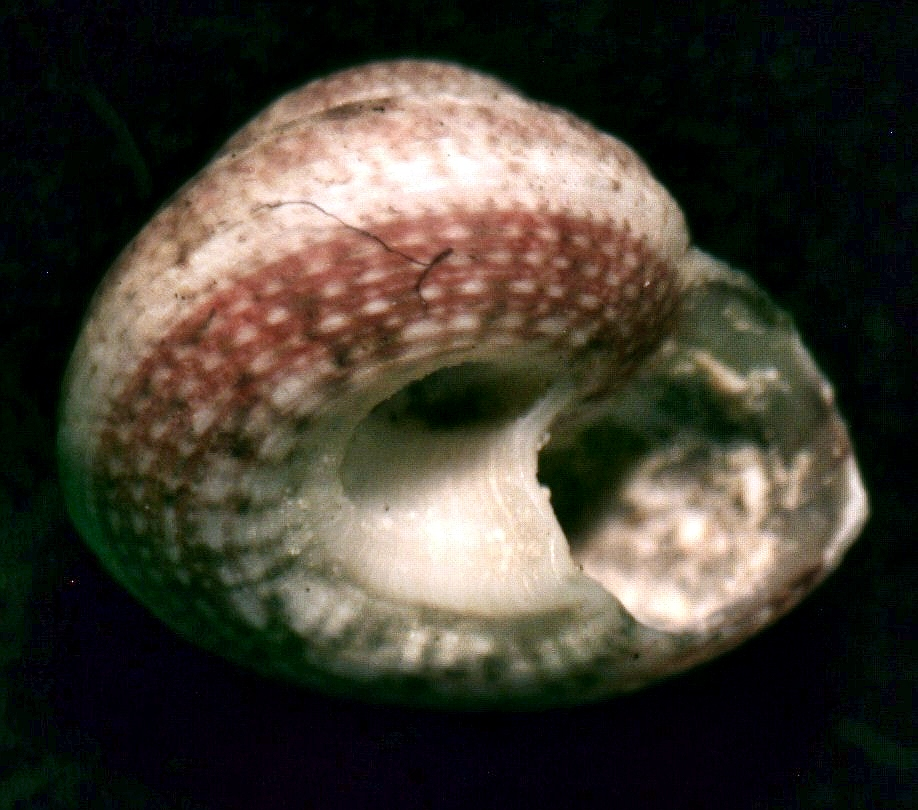
- Basal view of a shell of Solariella sanjuanensis

Scientific classification
- Kingdom: Animalia
- Phylum: Mollusca
- Class: Gastropoda
- Subclass: Vetigastropoda
- Order: Trochida
- Superfamily: Trochoidea
- Family: Solariellidae
- Genus: Solariella
- Species: S. sanjuanensis

Binomial name
- Solariella sanjuanensis Poppe, Tagaro & Dekker, 2006

= Solariella sanjuanensis =

Species of gastropod

Solariella sanjuanensis is a species of sea snail, a marine gastropod mollusk in the family Solariellidae.

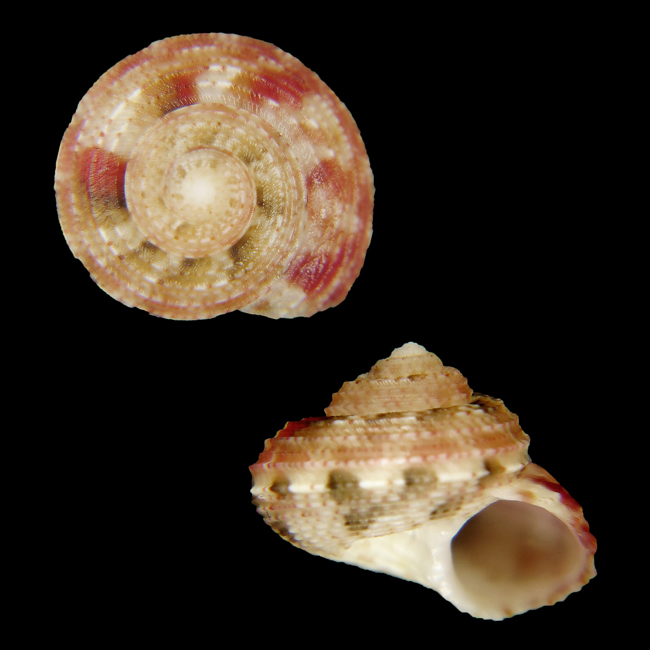
Seashell Solariella sanjuanensis

== Description ==
The size of the shell varies between 3.8 mm and 6.5 mm.

== Distribution ==
This marine species occurs off the Philippines.

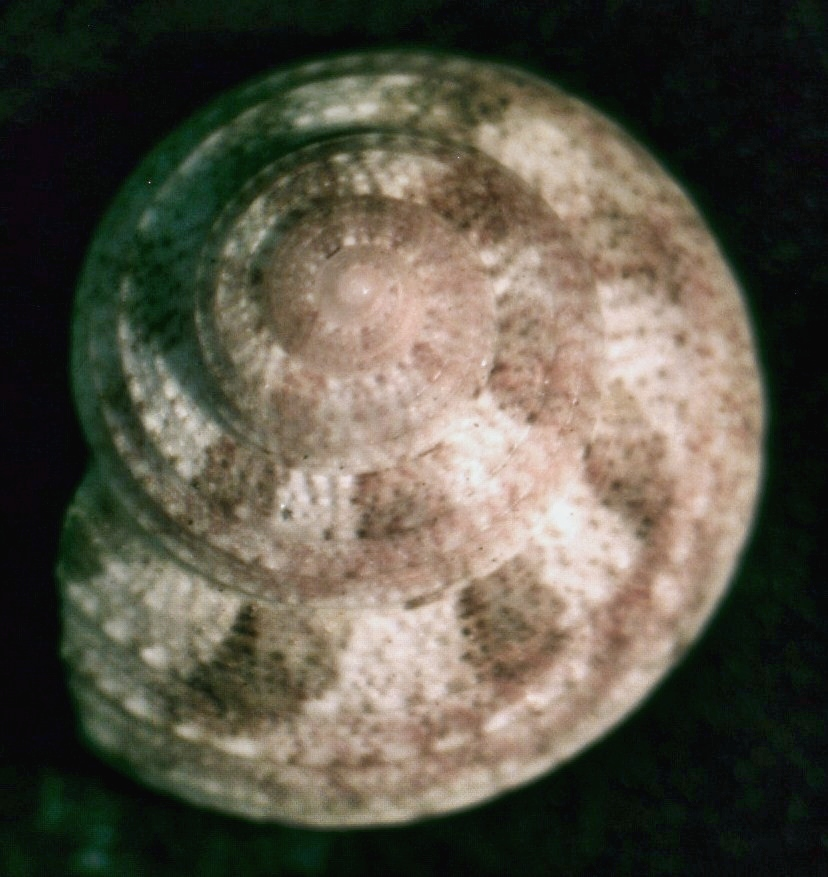
Solariella sanjuanensis, apical view
