= Spectamen benthicola =

Scientific classification
- Kingdom: Animalia
- Phylum: Mollusca
- Class: Gastropoda
- Subclass: Vetigastropoda
- Order: Trochida
- Superfamily: Trochoidea
- Family: Solariellidae
- Genus: Solariella
- Species: S. benthicola

Binomial name
- Solariella benthicola (Powell, 1937)

Synonyms
- Solariella benthicola Powell, 1976; Zeminolia benthicola Powell, 1937

Species of gastropod

Spectamen benthicola is a species of sea snail, a marine gastropod mollusk in the family Solariellidae. The height of the shell attains 5 mm, its diameter 5.5 mm. This marine species is endemic to New Zealand and occurs around the Three Kings Islands at a depth of 260 m.
