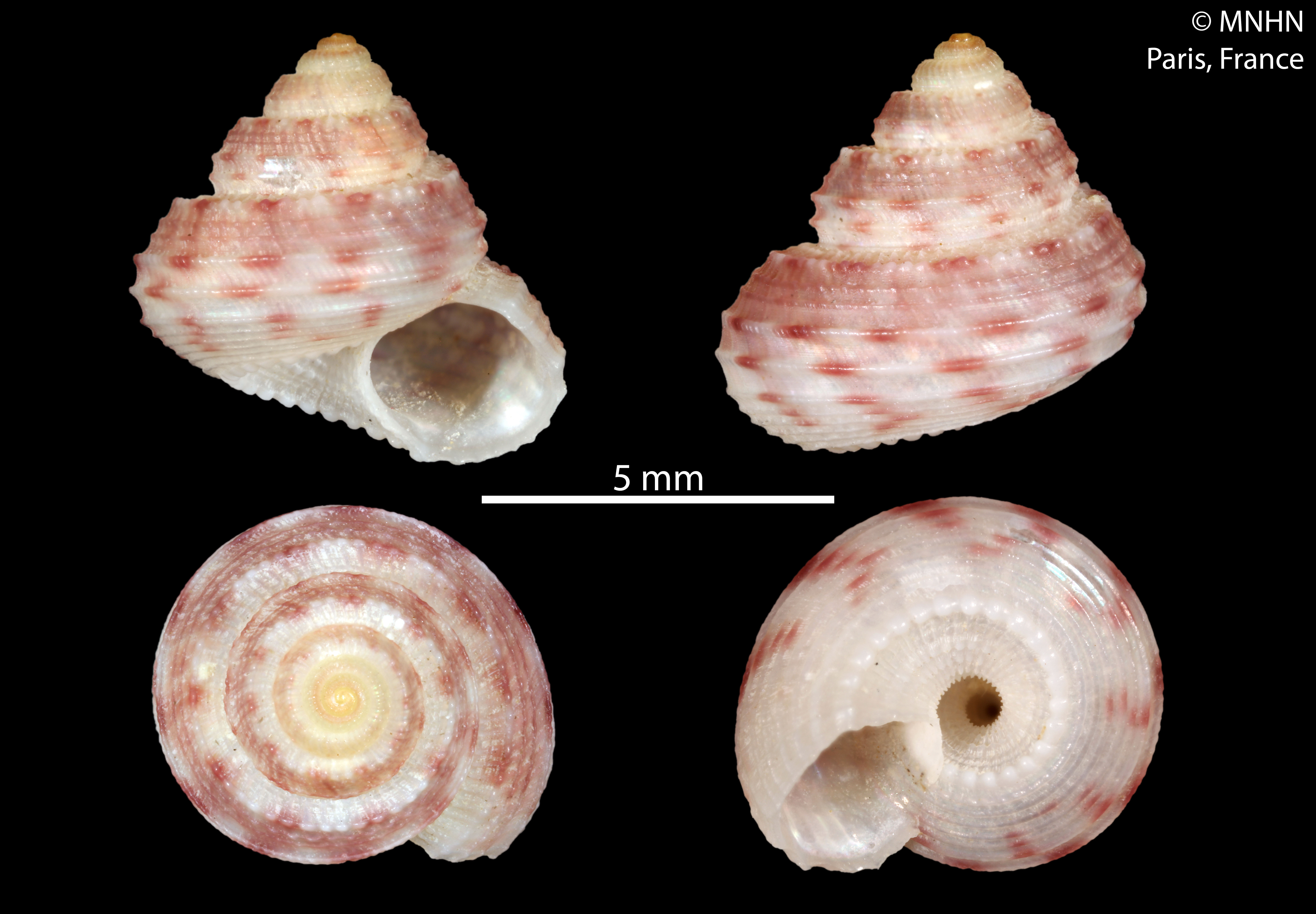
- Shell of Solariella segersi (paratype at MNHN, Paris)

Scientific classification
- Kingdom: Animalia
- Phylum: Mollusca
- Class: Gastropoda
- Subclass: Vetigastropoda
- Order: Trochida
- Superfamily: Trochoidea
- Family: Solariellidae
- Genus: Solariella
- Species: S. segersi

Binomial name
- Solariella segersi (Poppe, Tagaro & Dekker, 2006)

Synonyms
- Minolia segersi Poppe, Tagaro & Dekker, 2006

= Solariella segersi =

Species of gastropod

Solariella segersi is a species of sea snail, a marine gastropod mollusk in the family Solariellidae.
