= Solariella kempi =

Scientific classification
- Kingdom: Animalia
- Phylum: Mollusca
- Class: Gastropoda
- Subclass: Vetigastropoda
- Order: Trochida
- Superfamily: Trochoidea
- Family: Solariellidae
- Genus: Solariella
- Species: S. kempi

Binomial name
- Solariella kempi A. W. B. Powell, 1951

Species of gastropod

Solariella kempi is a species of sea snail, a marine gastropod mollusk in the family Solariellidae.

== Description ==
The size of the shell attains 12 mm.

== Distribution ==
This marine species occurs in the Atlantic Ocean off Argentina and the Falkland Islands at depths between 50 m and 545 m.
