= Solariella micraulax =

Scientific classification
- Kingdom: Animalia
- Phylum: Mollusca
- Class: Gastropoda
- Subclass: Vetigastropoda
- Order: Trochida
- Superfamily: Trochoidea
- Family: Solariellidae
- Genus: Solariella
- Species: S. micraulax

Binomial name
- Solariella micraulax J. H. McLean, 1964

Species of gastropod

Solariella micraulax, common name the fine-groove solarelle, is a species of sea snail, a marine gastropod mollusk in the family Solariellidae. The species was first discovered in 1964 by James H. McLean. The name is derived from a Greek noun, meaning "small furrows" with reference to its characteristic spiral sculpture.

== Description ==
The size of the shell attains 8 mm, considered medium size for its genus. Above the shell periphery is a brownish color, turning cream colored at the base and umbilical area.

With a protruding central cusped rachidian tooth and lateral teeth cusped only at the outer edge to the exterior, with reduced number of marginal teeth, such is typical of the mollusks of Solariella genus. Different from other Solariella species from the North Pacific, Solariella micraulax lacks prominent axial sculpture in its shell, with only traces suggested by growth lines passing the first four spiral cords adjacent to the suture.

== Distribution ==
This marine species occurs in the Pacific Ocean off Alaska.
