= Solariella tavernia =

Scientific classification
- Kingdom: Animalia
- Phylum: Mollusca
- Class: Gastropoda
- Subclass: Vetigastropoda
- Order: Trochida
- Superfamily: Trochoidea
- Family: Solariellidae
- Genus: Solariella
- Species: S. tavernia

Binomial name
- Solariella tavernia Dall, 1919

Species of gastropod

Solariella tavernia is a species of sea snail, a marine gastropod mollusk in the family Solariellidae.

== Description ==
The height of the shell attains 3.5 mm, its diameter 4 mm. The small, white shell has a subglobular nucleus and 3½ subsequent whorls. The deep suture is distinct. The spiral sculpture on the spire consists of four or five equally distributed and subequal small threads with wider interspaces and a narrow flattish space in front of the suture. The intercalary threads appear on the penultimate whorl. On the first half of the body whorl they become numerous, covering the whole surface uniformly, but a little coarser on the verge of the umbilicus which is moderately wide and deep. This sculpture becomes obsolete and the last quarter of the body whorl is perfectly smooth and polished. The axial sculpture consists of numerous retractively arcuate threads beginning at the suture and extending feebly to the periphery on the upper part of the spire, later becoming obsolete. The base of the shell is rounded. The aperture is subcircular, simple and sharp. The lips are connected by a glaze on the body and are not reflected.

== Distribution ==
This species occurs in the Pacific Ocean off the Galapagos Islands.
