= Phragmomphalina tenuiseptum =

Conservation status
- Not Threatened (NZ TCS)

Scientific classification
- Kingdom: Animalia
- Phylum: Mollusca
- Class: Gastropoda
- Subclass: Vetigastropoda
- Order: Trochida
- Superfamily: Trochoidea
- Family: Solariellidae
- Genus: Phragmomphalina
- Species: P. tenuiseptum

Binomial name
- Phragmomphalina tenuiseptum (Marshall, 1999)

Synonyms
- Archiminolia tenuiseptum B. A. Marshall, 1999 (original combination)

Species of gastropod

Phragmomphalina tenuiseptum is a species of sea snail, a marine gastropod mollusc in the family Solariellidae.

== Description ==
The diameter of the shell attains 17 mm.

== Distribution ==
This marine species is endemic to New Zealand and occurs off the Three Kings Rise at depths between 780 m and 790 m.
