= Solariella crossata =

Scientific classification
- Kingdom: Animalia
- Phylum: Mollusca
- Class: Gastropoda
- Subclass: Vetigastropoda
- Order: Trochida
- Superfamily: Trochoidea
- Family: Solariellidae
- Genus: Solariella
- Species: S. crossata

Binomial name
- Solariella crossata Dall, 1927

Species of gastropod

Solariella crossata is a species of sea snail, a marine gastropod mollusk in the family Solariellidae. It was discovered by William H. Dall of the United States National Museum (now the Smithsonian Institution) from the examination samples of seashells collected by ships off the coast of Georgia as part of a greater project to discover new species. It was part of a batch of 204 undiscovered species at the time.

== Description ==
As described by William Healey Dall in 1927, this species is characterized by a shell size reaching up to 2.2 mm and a diameter of 4.2 mm.

William Healey Dall provides a long detailed description of the shell in his original publication:

Shell small, brilliantly polished, white, thin, with a bulbous sub-spherical smooth nucleus and about four subsequent whorls; suture distinct, the whorl in front of it depressed; axial sculpture of numerous equal and equally spaced plications radiating straightly from the axis but hardly reaching the periphery; these become more feeble toward the end of the last whorl; the incremental lines are delicate and silky; spiral sculpture of fine equal striation covering the whole surface, more or less strong in different individuals; around the rather wide funicular umbilicus is a strong more or less beaded cord with one or two conspicuous grooves outside of it; walls of the umbilicus finely spirally striated; aperture nearly circular, the margins thin, sharp; internally nacreous...

— William Healey Dall, Small Shells from Dredgings off the Southeast Coast of the United States by the United States Fisheries Steamer Albatross in 1885 and 1886, Page 8

== Distribution ==
The only known sightings of Solariella crossata were both off the coast of Georgia, at about 678 meters and 978 meters.
