= Solariella quinni =

Scientific classification
- Kingdom: Animalia
- Phylum: Mollusca
- Class: Gastropoda
- Subclass: Vetigastropoda
- Order: Trochida
- Superfamily: Trochoidea
- Family: Solariellidae
- Genus: Solariella
- Species: S. quinni

Binomial name
- Solariella quinni Barros & Pereira, 2008

Species of gastropod

Solariella quinni is a species of sea snail, a marine gastropod mollusk, in the family Solariellidae.

== Distribution ==
This species occurs in Pernambuco.
