= Solariella triplostephanus =

Scientific classification
- Kingdom: Animalia
- Phylum: Mollusca
- Class: Gastropoda
- Subclass: Vetigastropoda
- Order: Trochida
- Superfamily: Trochoidea
- Family: Solariellidae
- Genus: Solariella
- Species: S. triplostephanus

Binomial name
- Solariella triplostephanus Dall, 1910

Species of gastropod

Solariella triplostephanus is a species of sea snail, a marine gastropod mollusk in the family Solariellidae.

== Description ==
The height of the shell attains 5.25 mm, its diameter 7 mm. The shell has a trochiform shape with six tabulate whorls. The nucleus is very minute, glassy, slightly tilted. The subsequent whorls are flat above, with closely appressed suture. Three strong spirals girdle the whorls. The one at the shoulder is strongly beaded; one at the middle of the whorl is minutely undulate, and the third at the suture is simple, and obscured on all the whorls but the last by the suture being laid against it. On the body whorl there may be a few microscopic spiral threadlets between the shoulder and the median spiral. Between the anterior spiral and the edge of the umbilicus on the base there are six or eight fine-channeled spiral grooves. The cord bordering the funicular umbilicus is coarsely beaded. Within the umbilicus there are three or more similar but smaller beaded threads. The axial sculpture consists of fine, sharp, uniform and closely set elevated lines corresponding with the lines of growth, but frequently more or less obsolete; The aperture is nearly circular, oblique, with simple edges, hardly interrupted on the body. The throat is pearly. The colors of this little shell are yellowish-white, with flames, dots or blotches of lilac or purple-brown.

== Distribution ==
This species occurs in the Pacific Ocean from southern California to Panama.
