= Solariella galkini =

Scientific classification
- Kingdom: Animalia
- Phylum: Mollusca
- Class: Gastropoda
- Subclass: Vetigastropoda
- Order: Trochida
- Superfamily: Trochoidea
- Family: Solariellidae
- Genus: Solariella
- Species: S. galkini

Binomial name
- Solariella galkini Bagirov, 1995

Species of gastropod

Solariella galkini is a species of sea snail, a marine gastropod mollusk in the family Solariellidae. This species was first described by Bagirov in 1995.

== Description ==
The shell of Solariella galkini is relatively small, with a maximum size of about 6 mm. The aperture is round, and the outer lip is thin and slightly flared.

== Distribution ==
Solariella galkini is found in the Northeast Pacific, particularly off the Kurile Islands in Russia.
