= S. maculata =

S. maculata may refer to:

- Sabatia maculata, a plant endemic to the eastern United States
- Saccogaster maculata, a viviparous brotula
- Salisia maculata, a herbaceous plant
- Sarangesa maculata, an African butterfly
- Scapteira maculata, a lizard endemic to northwestern Africa
- Scardamia maculata, a geometer moth
- Schinia maculata, a flower moth
- Scolia maculata, a very large wasp
- Selenaria maculata, a moss animal
- Setia maculata, a sea snail
- Shebania maculata, a snout moth
- Sigapatella maculata, a sea snail
- Sillago maculata, a coastal marine fish
- Siphona maculata, a tachina fly
- Skenea maculata, a sea snail
- Solariella maculata, a top snail
- Spermophora maculata, a cellar spider
- Spiloconis maculata, a net-winged insect
- Squilla maculata, a mantis shrimp
- Stachyris maculata, an Old World babbler
- Stagmomantis maculata, a mantis native to the Americas
- Stathmopoda maculata, a concealer moth
- Statilia maculata, a praying mantis
- Stauntonia maculata, a flowering plant
- Stellognatha maculata, a flat-faced longhorn
- Stomatella maculata, a sea snail
- Stratiomys maculata, a soldier fly
- Subula maculata, an auger snail
- Swanka maculata, a mud turtle
- Symbolia maculata, a long-legged fly
- Synapta maculata, a sea cucumber
- Synaptula maculata, a sea cucumber
- Synemon maculata, a diurnal moth
