= Solariella trivialis =

Scientific classification
- Kingdom: Animalia
- Phylum: Mollusca
- Class: Gastropoda
- Subclass: Vetigastropoda
- Order: Trochida
- Superfamily: Trochoidea
- Family: Solariellidae
- Genus: Solariella
- Species: †S. trivialis

Binomial name
- †Solariella trivialis Lozouet, 2015

Extinct species of gastropod

Solariella trivialis is an extinct species of sea snail, a marine gastropod mollusk, in the family Solariellidae.

== Distribution ==
This species occurs in France.
