= Solariella marginata =

Scientific classification
- Kingdom: Animalia
- Phylum: Mollusca
- Class: Gastropoda
- Subclass: Vetigastropoda
- Order: Trochida
- Superfamily: Trochoidea
- Family: Solariellidae
- Genus: Solariella
- Species: S. marginata

Binomial name
- Solariella marginata Schepman, 1908

Species of mollusk

Solariella marginata is a species of sea snail, a marine gastropod mollusk, in the family Solariellidae.

== Distribution ==
This species occurs in Sulu Archipelago.
