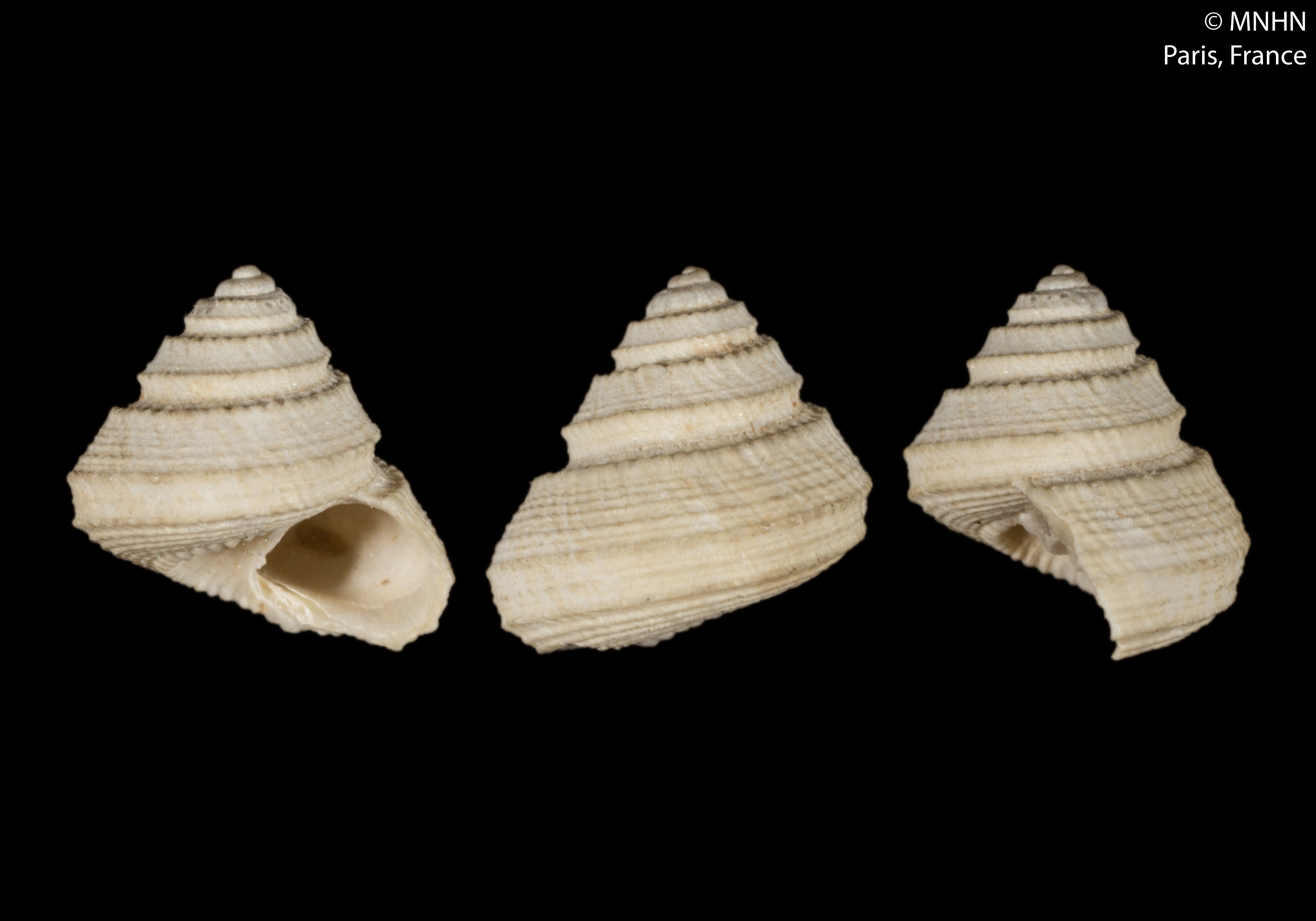
- Shell of Solariella amabilis (syntype at MNHN, Paris)

Scientific classification
- Kingdom: Animalia
- Phylum: Mollusca
- Class: Gastropoda
- Subclass: Vetigastropoda
- Order: Trochida
- Superfamily: Trochoidea
- Family: Solariellidae
- Genus: Solariella
- Species: S. amabilis

Binomial name
- Solariella amabilis (Jeffreys, 1865)

Synonyms
- Machaeroplax affinis Friele, 1877; Machaeroplax hidalgoi Fischer P. 1882; Solariella affinis (Friele, 1877); Trochus amabilis Jeffreys, 1865 (original combination); Trochus amabilis var. affinis Friele, 1877

= Solariella amabilis =

Species of gastropod

Solariella amabilis is a species of sea snail, a marine gastropod mollusk in the family Solariellidae.

== Description ==
(Original description by Jeffreys) The height of the shell attains 8 mm, its diameter 7 mm. The pure pearl-white, pyramidal shell is moderately solid. It is semitransparent, of a pearly and partially iridescent luster. Its sculpture shows two spiral ridges or keels on the upper part of each of the last three or four whorls, and one on the upper part of the next or smaller whorl, besides several finer but irregular ridges on the base of the last or largest whorl, and numerous minute spiral striae between all the ridges. The principal ridges are placed near the suture of each whorl, both above and below, leaving a broad flattened space in the middle and a narrow excavated space below the suture, thus imparting a tower-like appearance to the shell. The upper whorls are also marked with numerous short and fine longitudinal ribs, which cross the ridges and make them crenelated. The spire is elevated. The apex is semiglobose, prominent and slightly twisted. The seven whorls increase gradually in size. The suture is very distinct. The aperture is nearly circular, but angulated or somewhat notched below by the umbilical ridge. The outer lip is thin and slightly expanded. The inner lip is folded a little back on the umbilicus, and adheres to the columella. Inside, the shell is more or less iridescent. The umbilicus is large but not wide, funnel-shaped, and completely exposing the whole of the inner spire. It is encircled outside by a strong spiral ridge, which is often beaded, and winds like a staircase into the interior. The operculum forms a spiral of about a dozen whorls, the edges of which are imbricated and overlap one another in succession.

(Description as Solariella affinis) The whitish-pearly, thin shell is broadly umbilicated. It has a conoidal shape. The 5 1/2 convex whorls are separated by a gradated suture. They are ornamented with oblique, dense regular radiating costellae, and two spiral lirae on the lower part. The body whorl is ventricose, radiately costellate above, with three acute elevated median spiral cinguli, beneath with obsolete concentric striae. The umbilicus is wide, carinated at the periphery, plicate, and denticulate. The aperture is subcircular.

This marine species is finely and closely reticulated; the whorls are rounded and show no trace of angularity. The umbilicus is not encircled by a keel.

== Distribution ==
This species occurs in the Atlantic Ocean in the Bay of Biscay, off Iceland to Western Norway off Western Morocco and the West Indies.
