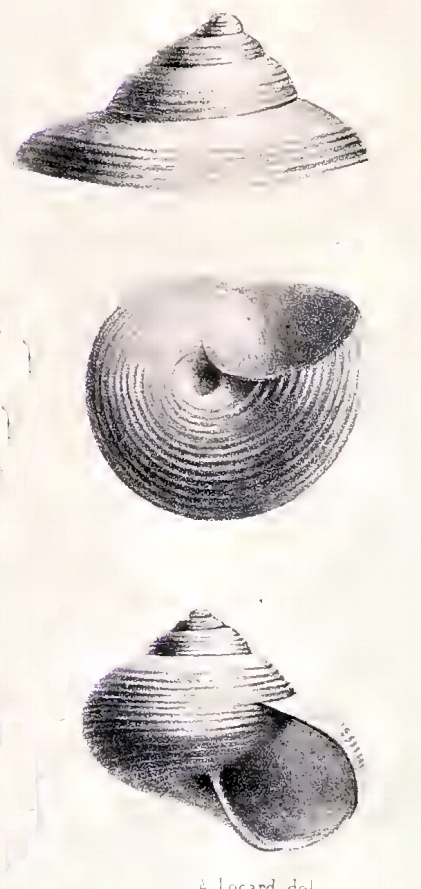
- Original drawing with three views of a shell of Solariella cingulima

Scientific classification
- Kingdom: Animalia
- Phylum: Mollusca
- Class: Gastropoda
- Subclass: Vetigastropoda
- Order: Trochida
- Superfamily: Trochoidea
- Family: Solariellidae
- Genus: Solariella
- Species: S. cingulima

Binomial name
- Solariella cingulima (Locard, 1898)

= Solariella cingulima =

Species of gastropod

Solariella cingulima is a species of sea snail, a marine gastropod mollusk in the family Solariellidae.

== Description ==
The height of the shell attains 6 3/4 mm, its diameter 8 1/2 mm. This small shell has a depressed turbinate shape. The spire is rather low and weakly acuminate. It consists of five convex whorls, somewhat flat above, slowly increasing in height but rapid in width. the body whorl is depressed as a whole, but fairly closely rounded at its lateral side, at the side opposite to the lip. It is almost as convex on top as below. The simple suture is linear. The small apex is round and not prominent. The deep umbilicus is narrow. The small aperture is subcircular and slightly transverse. It is slightly indented by the penultimate whorl and inscribed in an oblique plane. The peristome is simple with hardly converging sides. The sharp outer lip shows on the interior some marks of the external cords and inserts into the top middle of the penultimate whorl. The columellar edge is slightly arched and thickened, somewhat angular at the bottom, and slightly reflected on the umbilicus. Solid test, thick, decorated over its entire extent, The thick, solid shell is decorated over its entire extent, except within the umbilicus, with numerous decurrent cords. These are tight, subequal, rounded. The growth lines are flexuous, especially in the first whorls. The color of the shell is a ruddy yellow. The interior is iridescent.

== Distribution ==
This species is found at bathyal depths in the Northern Atlantic and off Portugal.
