= Solariella pompholugota =

Scientific classification
- Kingdom: Animalia
- Phylum: Mollusca
- Class: Gastropoda
- Subclass: Vetigastropoda
- Order: Trochida
- Superfamily: Trochoidea
- Family: Solariellidae
- Genus: Solariella
- Species: S. pompholugota

Binomial name
- Solariella pompholugota (Watson, 1879)

Synonyms
- Trochus (Margarita) pompholugotus Watson, 1879

Species of gastropod

Solariella pompholugota is a species of sea snail, a marine gastropod mollusk in the family Solariellidae.

The epithet "pompholugota" is derived from a Greek word, meaning "bubble-shaped"

== Description ==
(Original description by R.B. Watson) The size of the shell attains 10 mm. The thin, depressedly globose shell has a low turreted spire. It is opaque, chalky, rough and umbilicate. There are about 40 low, rounded spirals on the body whorl. These are very unequal, some being very minute. One or two above the periphery are stronger than the rest. The lowest of all is much the strongest and defines the umbilicus, within which the whole sculpture increases in distinctness. On the penultimate whorl there are about 12 spirals that are clearly stronger than on the last. The furrows are broader than the threads, but as they widen, they become occupied by a minute intermediate thread. Longitudinally, these spirals and furrows are crossed by much finer and sharper oblique threads, which in general are much narrower than their interstices. But towards the aperture, where all the sculpture becomes feebler, these threads become extremely numerous and crowded. The colour is yellowish chalky white over brilliant nacre. The spire is not much elevated, but slightly scalariform. The apex of the specimen is eroded. The five whorls are rounded and increase rapidly in size and become inflated on the base of the shell. The suture is impressed near the apex, while towards the aperture it becomes filled up, and is finally marginated, by the body whorl lapping up rather coarsely on the previous one. The aperture is rather oblique, a little higher than it is broad, slightly flattened above, and slightly angulated at the junction of the outer lip to the body. The thin lip is very little reflected on the umbilicus, porcellaneous on the edge, with a very slight pearly marginal callus, which is continuous across the body, and nacreous within. The large umbilicus is funnel-shaped, quickly contracting, but leaving the whole inner spire visible.

== Distribution ==
This marine species occurs off Puerto Rico and St. Thomas
