= Solariella depressa =

Scientific classification
- Kingdom: Animalia
- Phylum: Mollusca
- Class: Gastropoda
- Subclass: Vetigastropoda
- Order: Trochida
- Superfamily: Trochoidea
- Family: Solariellidae
- Genus: Solariella
- Species: S. depressa

Binomial name
- Solariella depressa (Dall, 1889)

Synonyms
- Margarita depressa Dall, 1889

Species of gastropod

Solariella depressa is a species of sea snail, a marine gastropod mollusk, in the family Solariellidae.
