= Solariella tubula =

Scientific classification
- Kingdom: Animalia
- Phylum: Mollusca
- Class: Gastropoda
- Subclass: Vetigastropoda
- Order: Trochida
- Superfamily: Trochoidea
- Family: Solariellidae
- Genus: Solariella
- Species: S. tubula

Binomial name
- Solariella tubula Dall, 1927

Species of gastropod

Solariella tubula is a species of sea snail, a marine gastropod mollusk in the family Solariellidae.

== Description ==
The size of the shell attains 5 mm.

== Distribution ==
This marine species occurs in the following locations:

- United Kingdom Exclusive Economic Zone
- Atlantic Ocean: from Georgia to East Florida, USA
