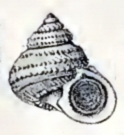
- Drawing with an apertural view of shell

Scientific classification
- Kingdom: Animalia
- Phylum: Mollusca
- Class: Gastropoda
- Subclass: Vetigastropoda
- Order: Trochida
- Family: Solariellidae
- Genus: Solariella
- Species: S. rhina

Binomial name
- Solariella rhina (R. B. Watson, 1886)

Synonyms
- Calliotropis rhina Watson, 1886; Margarita lima Watson, R.B., 1879 (basionym); Solariella aeglees var. rhina Watson, 1886; Trochus lima Watson, 1879; Trochus (Margarita) rhina Watson, 1886

= Solariella rhina =

Species of gastropod

Solariella rhina is a species of sea snail, a marine gastropod mollusk in the family Eucyclidae.

== Description ==
The shell grows to a length of 10 mm. The shell has a conical shape, with a broad and tumid base and a wide narrowed umbilicus. The surface is cross-hatched like a file. When fresh, the shell is translucent with a pearly sheen.

Spirals: There are three to five slightly raised remotely beaded threads, of which one lies a little below the suture and one at the periphery forming a carina, of which the beads are much smaller and closer set, sometimes evanescent. Another one with beads like the first, defines the umbilicus. Within the umbilicus there is a strong spiral ridge. The whole surface is covered with fine rather sharp threads, whose partings are twice as broad as themselves. Of these finer spirals, the one which meets the outer lip often rises into prominence and defines the base, while another above the carina sometimes stands out more strongly and more beaded than the rest.

Longitudinals: The whole surface is close-set with these, which are crossed by the spirals, than which they are broader but less sharp, closer-set, and more irregular and interrupted, especially near the upper line of tubercles and near the umbilicus.

The color of the shell is a bluish white when alive, with a translucent calcareous layer through which the nacre shines.

The high spire is a little scalar. The small apex is a little flattened, with the embryonic 1¼ whorl barely projecting in the middle. The spire contains 6–7 whorls, the last is of rapid increase, full rounded and a little tumid. The preceding ones are a little roundedly shouldered below the suture, flat on the contour, angulated at the carina, and slightly contracted into the suture. The apical whorls are simply rounded and longitudinally ribbed. The suture is linear, but strongly, not acutely defined by the perpendicular rise of the whorl above it and the slight sloping shoulder below. The aperture is round, scarcely oblique, with a translucent porcelaneous edge, and pearly within. The sharp outer lip is not descending. Its inner edge is beveled outwards at the expense of the pearly layer. The columellar lip bends over the umbilicus. It is a little reverted, and expands into a tooth at the intra-umbilical ridge. The funnel-shaped umbilicus is, wide and pervious, but narrowed within by the spiral ridge. The operculum consists of very many narrow whorls, which on their outer edge overlap as a narrow gleaming flange.

== Distribution ==
This species occurs in the upper bathyal zone of the Gulf of Mexico and in the Atlantic Ocean off the Azores
