= Solariella vancouverensis =

Scientific classification
- Kingdom: Animalia
- Phylum: Mollusca
- Class: Gastropoda
- Subclass: Vetigastropoda
- Order: Trochida
- Superfamily: Trochoidea
- Family: Solariellidae
- Genus: Solariella
- Species: S. vancouverensis

Binomial name
- Solariella vancouverensis (E. A. Smith, 1880)

Synonyms
- Trochus (Margarita) vancouverensis E. A. Smith, 1880; Trochus vancouverensis E. A. Smith, 1880

Species of gastropod

Solariella vancouverensis is a species of sea snail, a marine gastropod mollusk, in the family Solariellidae.
