= Solariella cristata =

Scientific classification
- Kingdom: Animalia
- Phylum: Mollusca
- Class: Gastropoda
- Subclass: Vetigastropoda
- Order: Trochida
- Superfamily: Trochoidea
- Family: Solariellidae
- Genus: Solariella
- Species: S. cristata

Binomial name
- Solariella cristata Quinn, 1992

Species of gastropod

Solariella cristata is a species of sea snail, a marine gastropod mollusk in the family Solariellidae.

== Distribution ==
This species occurs in the Gulf of Mexico, the Caribbean Sea and the Lesser Antilles in depths between 155 m and 256 m.

== Description ==
The maximum recorded shell length is 9.1 mm, its diameter 9.45 mm

== Habitat ==
Minimum recorded depth is 201 m. Maximum recorded depth is 256 m.
