= Solariella elegantula =

Scientific classification
- Kingdom: Animalia
- Phylum: Mollusca
- Class: Gastropoda
- Subclass: Vetigastropoda
- Order: Trochida
- Superfamily: Trochoidea
- Family: Solariellidae
- Genus: Solariella
- Species: S. elegantula

Binomial name
- Solariella elegantula Dall, 1925

Species of gastropod

Solariella elegantula is a species of sea snail, a marine gastropod mollusk in the family Solariellidae.

== Description ==
The size of the shell varies between 3.5 mm and 5.5 mm.

== Distribution ==
This marine species occurs in the Gulf of California, Western Mexico to Colombia.
