= Solariella bermejoi =

Scientific classification
- Kingdom: Animalia
- Phylum: Mollusca
- Class: Gastropoda
- Subclass: Vetigastropoda
- Order: Trochida
- Superfamily: Trochoidea
- Family: Solariellidae
- Genus: Solariella
- Species: S. bermejoi

Binomial name
- Solariella bermejoi Rolán, Hernández & Déniz, 2005

Species of gastropod

Solariella bermejoi is a species of sea snail, a marine gastropod mollusk in the family Solariellidae.

== Distribution ==
This species occurs in the Atlantic Ocean off Mauritania and the Canary Islands.
