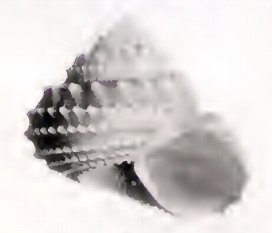
- Original drawing with an apertural view of a shell of Calliotropis ambigua

Scientific classification
- Kingdom: Animalia
- Phylum: Mollusca
- Class: Gastropoda
- Subclass: Vetigastropoda
- Superfamily: Seguenzioidea
- Family: Calliotropidae
- Genus: Calliotropis
- Species: C. ambigua

Binomial name
- Calliotropis ambigua (Dautzenberg & H. Fischer, 1896)

Synonyms
- Eumargarita rhina Dautzenberg (non Watson), 1889; Solariella ambigua Dautzenberg & H. Fischer, 1896

= Calliotropis ambigua =

Species of gastropod

Calliotropis ambigua is a species of sea snail, a marine gastropod mollusk in the family Eucyclidae.

This species is considered by Dautzenberg & Fischer (1906) as a synonym of Calliotropis vaillanti (Fischer, 1882) but tentatively maintained as separate species by Vilvens & Swennen (2008)
