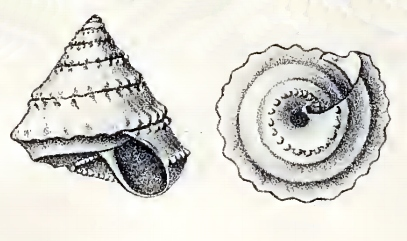
- Two views of a shell of Calliotropis lissocona

Scientific classification
- Kingdom: Animalia
- Phylum: Mollusca
- Class: Gastropoda
- Subclass: Vetigastropoda
- Family: Calliotropidae
- Genus: Calliotropis
- Species: C. lissocona

Binomial name
- Calliotropis lissocona (Dall, 1881)

Synonyms
- Margarita lissocona Dall, 1881 (basionym); Solariella lissocona (Dall, 1889); Trochus (Solariella) lissocona (Dall, 1889)

= Calliotropis lissocona =

Species of gastropod

Calliotropis lissocona is a species of sea snail, a marine gastropod mollusk in the family Eucyclidae.

== Description ==
The shell grows to a length of 6.3 mm. The shell has a conical shape. It consists of 6½ whorls, which glisten with that peculiar spun-glass or flossy luster noticeable in so many abyssal species. The sculpture consists of two lines closely appressed to the sutures, less prominent and less conspicuously provided with the angular projections than in Calliotropis vaillanti (P. Fischer, 1882). Between the upper and lower lines the surface of the whorl is smooth, except for lines of growth, shining as above described, and seems even a little concave. The nodules on the upper carina of one whorl fit into the spaces between the nodules on the lower carina of the preceding whorl, and thus alternate along the line of the suture and give it a wavy character. The carina on the body whorl is seen to be formed by two threads, which constitute the periphery, with fainter angularities than the others. The base of the shell is somewhat inflated, with two sharp, smooth threads between the periphery and the nodulate boundary of the small funnel-shaped umbilicus. The lines of growth are much as in Calliotropis vaillanti. The umbilicus is not infringed upon by any reflection of the columellar lip, and the aperture is about as wide as high, and less distinctly rectangular.

== Distribution ==
This species is distributed in the Caribbean Sea and the Gulf of Mexico
