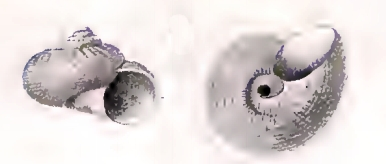
- Original drawing with two views of a shell of Zetela semisculpta

Scientific classification
- Kingdom: Animalia
- Phylum: Mollusca
- Class: Gastropoda
- Subclass: Vetigastropoda
- Order: Trochida
- Superfamily: Trochoidea
- Family: Solariellidae
- Genus: Zetela
- Species: Z. semisculpta

Binomial name
- Zetela semisculpta (Martens, 1904)

Synonyms
- Cyclostrema (Tubiola) semisculptum Martens, 1904; Cyclostrema semisculptum Martens, 1904; Solariella chuni Thiele, 1925; Solariella gilchristi Barnard, 1963; Solariella intermissa Thiele, 1925; Solariella macleari Barnard, 1963; Solariella semisculpta (Martens, 1904); Spectamen semisculptum (Martens, 1904)

= Zetela semisculpta =

Species of gastropod

Zetela semisculpta is a species of sea snail, a marine gastropod mollusk, in the family Solariellidae.

== Description ==
(described as Spectamen semisculptum) The height of the shell attains 3.1 mm, its diameter 4.6 mm. The thin, white shell has a depressed turbinate shape with a wide umbilicus. The acute spire is conoid. It contains 4.5 convex whorls. The suture is distinct, and not channeled. The umbilicus is funnel-shaped. The rounded aperture is slightly oblique. The peristome is thin, outer margin very colunellari slightly arched. The outer lip is pronounced. The columella is slightly arched.

== Distribution ==
This marine species occurs in the Indian Ocean off KwaZulu-Natal and the Agulhas Bank, South Africa.
