= Phragmomphalina =

Scientific classification
- Kingdom: Animalia
- Phylum: Mollusca
- Class: Gastropoda
- Subclass: Vetigastropoda
- Order: Trochida
- Family: Solariellidae
- Genus: Phragmomphalina; Iredale, 1929

Type species
- Phragmomphalina vilvensi Herbert & Williams, 2020

Species
- See text

Genus of gastropods

Phragmomphalina is a genus of sea snails, marine gastropod mollusks in the family Solariellidae, the top snails.

== Species ==
- Phragmomphalina alabida (B. A. Marshall, 1979)
- Phragmomphalina diadema (B. A. Marshall, 1999)
- Phragmomphalina tenuiseptum (B. A. Marshall, 1999)
- Phragmomphalina vilvensi Herbert & Williams, 2020
