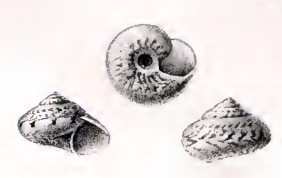
- Drawing with three views of a shell of Ilanga laevissima

Scientific classification
- Kingdom: Animalia
- Phylum: Mollusca
- Class: Gastropoda
- Subclass: Vetigastropoda
- Order: Trochida
- Superfamily: Trochoidea
- Family: Solariellidae
- Genus: Ilanga
- Species: I. laevissima

Binomial name
- Ilanga laevissima (Martens, 1881)

Synonyms
- Machaeroplax laevissima (Martens, 1881); Minolia (Machaeroplax) congener G.B. Sowerby, 1903; Minolia laevissima (Martens, 1881); Monilea laevissima (Martens, 1881); Solariella laevissima (Martens, 1881); Solariella nitens Thiele, 1925; Trochus laevissimus Martens, 1881

= Ilanga laevissima =

Species of gastropod

Ilanga laevissima is a species of sea snail, a marine gastropod mollusk in the family Solariellidae.

== Description ==
The size of the shell varies between 9 mm and 22 mm. The shell is broadly umbilicated and the spire has a depressed conoidal shape. It is sculptured with very fine, hardly visible spiral striae and is otherwise smooth. It is very shining, ashen-whitish, painted with light yellowish to light brown confluent flammules above and at the umbilicus. It is ornamented with waved zigzag and acutely angular light and dark brown streaks. The 5½ whorls are slightly convex, moderately sloping, separated by simple, deep-channeled sutures. The spire shows only here and there very faint traces of obsolete spiral striae. The broad body whorl convex above with small erect slightly angular nodules in three rows, the two rounded at the periphery, depressly convex at the base. The rather large and deep umbilicus is cylindrical. It is bordered on the outer edge by an obtuse angle, a second angle appearing a little way within the orifice. The space between the two angles is slightly flattened, numerous very distinct close-set plicae traverse this space, crossing the angles. The rather large, diagonal aperture is rounded-trapezoidal. The thin, simple peristome is incomplete. The columellar margin is straightened, forming an obtuse angle where it joins the basal lip. The outer lip is sloping above, rounded at the base. The horny, concave operculum is thin with 6-7 whorls and has a raised lamina at the suture of the whorls.

== Distribution ==
This marine species occurs off Zululand to the Atlantic Cape Province, South Africa
