= Suavotrochus =

Scientific classification
- Kingdom: Animalia
- Phylum: Mollusca
- Class: Gastropoda
- Subclass: Vetigastropoda
- Order: Trochida
- Family: Solariellidae
- Genus: Suavotrochus; Dall, 1924

Type species
- Solariella lubrica (Dall, 1881)

Species
- See text

Genus of gastropods

Suavotrochus is a genus of sea snails, marine gastropod molluscs in the family Solariellidae within the superfamily Trochoidea.

== Species ==
Species within the genus Suavotrochus include:

- Suavotrochus lubricus (Dall, 1881)
