= Lamellitrochus lamellosus =

Scientific classification
- Kingdom: Animalia
- Phylum: Mollusca
- Class: Gastropoda
- Subclass: Vetigastropoda
- Order: Trochida
- Superfamily: Trochoidea
- Family: Solariellidae
- Genus: Lamellitrochus
- Species: L. lamellosus

Binomial name
- Lamellitrochus lamellosus (Verrill & S. Smith, 1880)

Synonyms
- Margarita lamellosa A. E. Verrill & S. I. Smith, 1880 (original description); Solariella lamellosus A. E. Verrill & S. I. Smith, 1880; Solariella tiara auct. non Watson, 1879; Zetela lamellosus (A. E. Verrill & S. I. Smith, 1880)

Species of gastropod

Lamellitrochus lamellosus is a species of sea snail, a marine gastropod mollusk in the family Solariellidae.

== Distribution ==
This species occurs in the Gulf of Mexico and in the Atlantic Ocean off North Carolina and Florida

== Description ==
The maximum recorded shell length is 4.2 mm, its diameter 3.55 mm.

(Original description by Verrill & Smith) The small, fragile, white, nacreous shell has a conico-turbinate shape. It is canaliculate, with a wide umbilicus. The five, shouldered whorls are angulated and carinated below the middle, swollen just below the suture, which lies in a deep channel. They are crossed, above the peripheral carina by numerous elevated, thin, oblique ribs, which rise into lamellas near the suture, where they join the carina forming small nodules. Between the ribs are fine parallel lines of growth and sometimes a few fine revolving lines. Below the periphery, in line with the posterior edge of the lip, there is a smaller, plain, angular rib, and around the umbilicus there is a strong nodulose rib. Between these ribs, the base is covered with fine revolving lines. Within the umbilicus are radiating raised lines which cross two or three small revolving ribs. The aperture is rounded, with angles corresponding to the ribs.

== Habitat ==
Minimum recorded depth is 25 m. Maximum recorded depth is 250 m.
