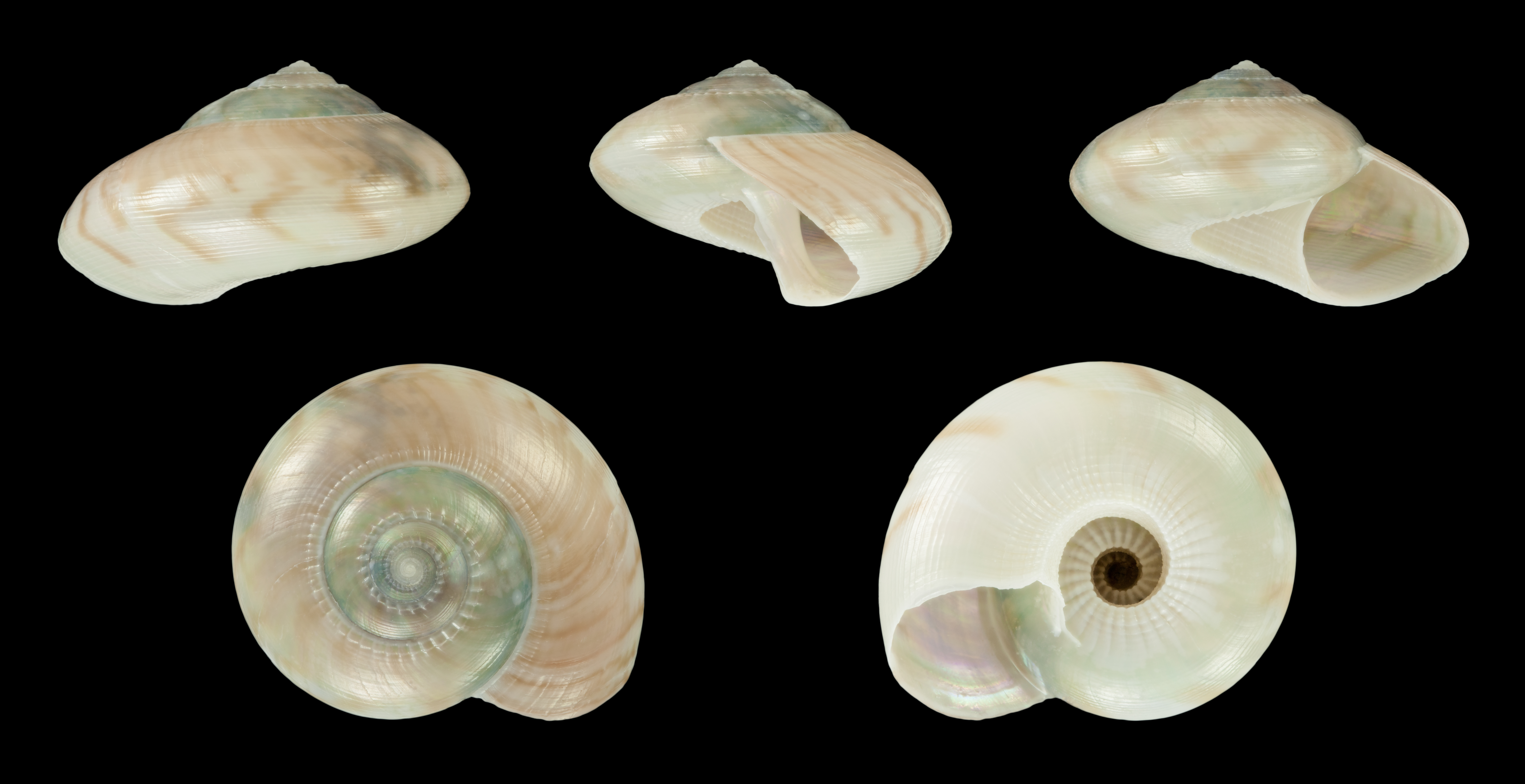

Scientific classification
- Kingdom: Animalia
- Phylum: Mollusca
- Class: Gastropoda
- Subclass: Vetigastropoda
- Order: Trochida
- Superfamily: Trochoidea
- Family: Solariellidae
- Genus: Ilanga
- Species: I. biradiatula

Binomial name
- Ilanga biradiatula (Martens, 1902)

Synonyms
- Solariella (Microgaza) meyeri Kilburn, 1973; Solariella biradiatula Martens, 1902 (original description); Solariella meyeri Kilburn, 1973

= Ilanga biradiatula =

Species of gastropod

Ilanga biradiatula is a species of sea snail, a marine gastropod mollusk in the family Solariellidae.

== Description ==
The size of the shell attains 16 mm.

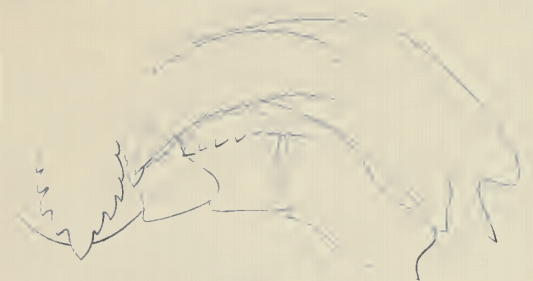
Part of the radula of Ilanga biradiatula

The rhipidoglossan radula is unusually short, about 1.2 mm long and about half as wide. The middle plate is heavily curved and has on each side five strong teeth with tips directed towards the rear. The two inner intermediate plates are about as wide as long. The cutting edge of the first is substantially bent over and turned slightly towards the center, but much smaller than that of the middle plate. Its side edge has five teeth, the central part one or two. The cutting edge of the following plate is more directed towards the middle and has five teeth on the longer side. The third intermediate plate is significantly greater, approximately twice as wide as the two inner plates, but the indentation is smaller and hardly bent back, but turned towards the middle and is provided with three irregular teeth at the edge.

== Distribution ==
This species occurs in the Indian Ocean from Tanzania and Mozambique to Transkei, South Africa, at depths between 480 m and 570 m.
