= Suavotrochus lubricus =

Scientific classification
- Kingdom: Animalia
- Phylum: Mollusca
- Class: Gastropoda
- Subclass: Vetigastropoda
- Order: Trochida
- Family: Solariellidae
- Genus: Suavotrochus
- Species: S. lubricus

Binomial name
- Suavotrochus lubricus (Dall, 1881)

Synonyms
- Margarita lubrica Dall, 1881 (original combination); Solariella lubrica (Dall, 1881)

Species of gastropod

Suavotrochus lubrica is a species of sea snail, a marine gastropod mollusk in the family Solariellidae.

== Distribution ==
This species occurs in the Gulf of Mexico and in the Caribbean Sea.

== Description ==
The maximum recorded shell length is 4 mm.

== Habitat ==
Minimum recorded depth is 73 m. Maximum recorded depth is 1472 m.
