= Ilanga agulhaensis =

Scientific classification
- Kingdom: Animalia
- Phylum: Mollusca
- Class: Gastropoda
- Subclass: Vetigastropoda
- Order: Trochida
- Superfamily: Trochoidea
- Family: Solariellidae
- Genus: Ilanga
- Species: I. agulhaensis

Binomial name
- Ilanga agulhaensis (Thiele, 1925)

Synonyms
- Solariella agulhaensis Thiele, 1925; Solariella multistriata Barnard, 1963

Species of gastropod

Ilanga agulhaensis is a species of sea snail, a marine gastropod mollusk in the family Solariellidae.

== Description ==
The height of the shell attains 5 mm, its diameter is 7 mm. The growth lines form axial pleats at the rim of the umbilicus. The aperture is slightly triangular. The periphery is slightly convex .

== Distribution ==
This marine species occurs off Southeast Africa.
