= Calliotropis hondoensis =

Scientific classification
- Kingdom: Animalia
- Phylum: Mollusca
- Class: Gastropoda
- Subclass: Vetigastropoda
- Family: Calliotropidae
- Genus: Calliotropis
- Species: C. hondoensis

Binomial name
- Calliotropis hondoensis (Dall, 1919)

Synonyms
- Calliotropis (Solaricida) hondoensis (Dall, 1919); Solariella hondoensis Dall, 1919

Species of sea snail

Calliotropis hondoensis is a species of sea snail, a marine gastropod mollusk in the family Eucyclidae.

== Distribution ==
This marine species occurs off Japan and the Philippines.
