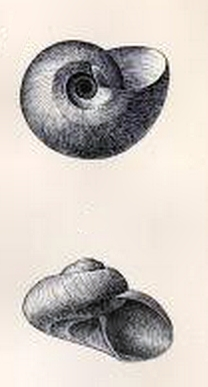
- Drawing with two views of a shell of Chonospeira nuda

Scientific classification
- Kingdom: Animalia
- Phylum: Mollusca
- Class: Gastropoda
- Subclass: Vetigastropoda
- Order: Trochida
- Superfamily: Trochoidea
- Family: Solariellidae
- Genus: Chonospeira
- Species: C. nuda

Binomial name
- Chonospeira nuda (Dall, 1896)

Synonyms
- Solariella nuda Dall, 1896; Solariella (Solariella) nuda Dall, 1896

= Chonospeira =

Genus of gastropods

Chonospeira is a monotypic genus of sea snail, a marine gastropod mollusk in the family Solariellidae. Its sole accepted species is Chonospeira nuda, common name the naked solarelle.

== Description ==
The height of the shell attains 15 mm, its diameter is 19 mm. The smooth, polished shell has a turbinate shape. The four whorls contain a few obscure spiral markings which do not interrupt the surface. This lack of ornament is remarkable. The color of the shell is white, with a pink or blue nacre glowing through. The whorls are rounded, flattened in front of the suture. The base of the shell is rounded. The wide umbilicus is funicular. The rounded aperture is oblique, hardly angulate by the umbilical rib, and with a very short interruption between the inner and outer lips. The thin, pale yellow operculum is light brown and has about ten whorls.

== Distribution ==
This species occurs in the Pacific Ocean off California, USA to Baja California, Mexico.
