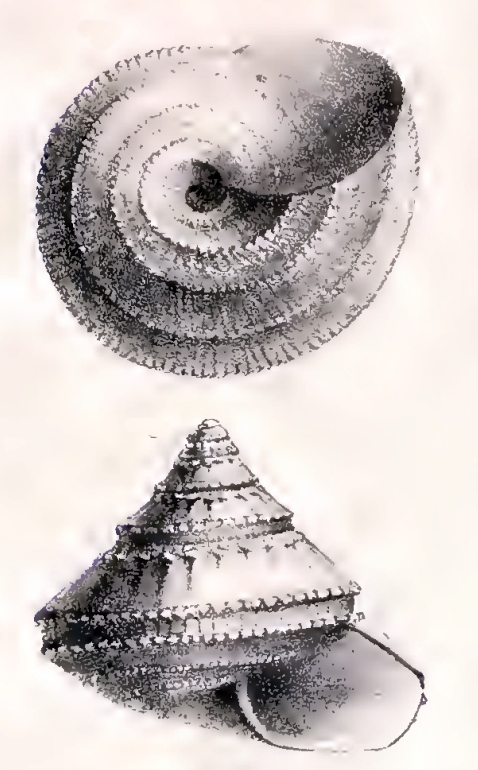
- Original drawing with two views of a shell of Calliotropis talismani

Scientific classification
- Kingdom: Animalia
- Phylum: Mollusca
- Class: Gastropoda
- Subclass: Vetigastropoda
- Superfamily: Seguenzioidea
- Family: Calliotropidae
- Genus: Calliotropis
- Species: C. talismani

Binomial name
- Calliotropis talismani (Locard, 1898)

Synonyms
- Solariella talismani Locard, 1898

= Calliotropis talismani =

Species of gastropod

Calliotropis talismani is a species of sea snail, a marine gastropod mollusk in the family Eucyclidae.

== Description ==
The height of the shell attains 7.75 mm.

== Distribution ==
This species occurs in the Atlantic Ocean off Morocco and Western Africa at depths between 840 m and 1350 m.
