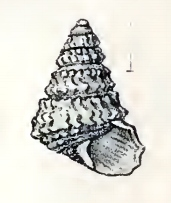
- Drawing with an apertural view of the shell of Calliotropis tiara

Scientific classification
- Kingdom: Animalia
- Phylum: Mollusca
- Class: Gastropoda
- Subclass: Vetigastropoda
- Family: Calliotropidae
- Genus: Calliotropis
- Species: C. tiara

Binomial name
- Calliotropis tiara (Watson, 1879)

Synonyms
- Calliotropis scabriusculus (Watson, 1879) (incorrect gender ending); Solariella tiara (Watson, 1879); Trochus (Ziziphinus) tiara Watson, 1879 (original combination)

= Calliotropis tiara =

Species of gastropod

Calliotropis tiara is a species of sea snail, a marine gastropod mollusk in the family Eucyclidae.

== Distribution ==
This species occurs in the Gulf of Mexico and the West Indies.

== Description ==
(Original description by Watson) The maximum recorded shell length is 5.6 mm. The small, high-spired shell has a conical shape and is flatly rounded on the base. It is white, dull on the surface, with a bright nacreous gleam shining through. Spirals: On the upper part of the body whorl there are two rows of tubercles, the first and weaker one is close up to the suture. The second is a little lower than the middle, and its tubercles are strong. Of these there are on each row twenty to twenty-five. They are scarcely connected by a spiral thread. The periphery is sharply angulated and defined by an expressed and tubercled carina, the tubercles of which are hardly so strong as those of the second row above, which from its larger points projects quite as much as the carina. On the base there is an infracarinal furrow and three or four sharpish, equally parted, faintly tubercled, spiral threads, the inmost of which is most distinctly tubercled, and defines the umbilical depression.

Longitudinals: The apical whorls, except the embryonic one, are crossed by high, sharp, slightly oblique ribs. But these on the later whorls break up into tubercles, between which on the different rows there is a slight irregular connexion by flattened ridges, which are oblique, interrupted, and on the base sinuous. Besides these the surface is roughened by minute wavy irregular lines of growth.

The colour of the shell is white, with a translucent layer of porcellanous glaze over brilliant pearly nacre. The spire is high. The flattened apex is small, with the minute inflated 1¼ embryonic whorl rising a little exserted on one side. There are seven whorls projecting out squarely below the suture, flattened in the middle, protuberant at the second row of tubercles, and slightly contracted above the carina. At the carina they are sharply angulated. The base of the shell, which is flatly rounded, has a narrow flattish margin, and in the middle a slight umbilical depression, in the centre of which is a minute umbilical hole almost covered by the columellar lip. The suture is linear. The aperture is scarcely oblique, and very slightly inclined out from the axial line. It is squarish, but rounded on the base and at the angles, a little broader than high, nacreous within. The outer lip is not thin, and has a slight callus just within it. It is slightly sinuated on the base at the outer corner. The columellar lip on leaving the body, bends over very flatly so as to cover the umbilicus, after which it curves round to the left. It has a very blunt tubercle in the middle, is a little reverted, and has a very slight furrow behind it. The umbilicus has a small open depression leading into a minute central pore. The slopes of the depression are obliquely scored by the tubercles of the central basal thread.

== Habitat ==
Minimum recorded depth is 350 m. Maximum recorded depth is 1,966 m.
