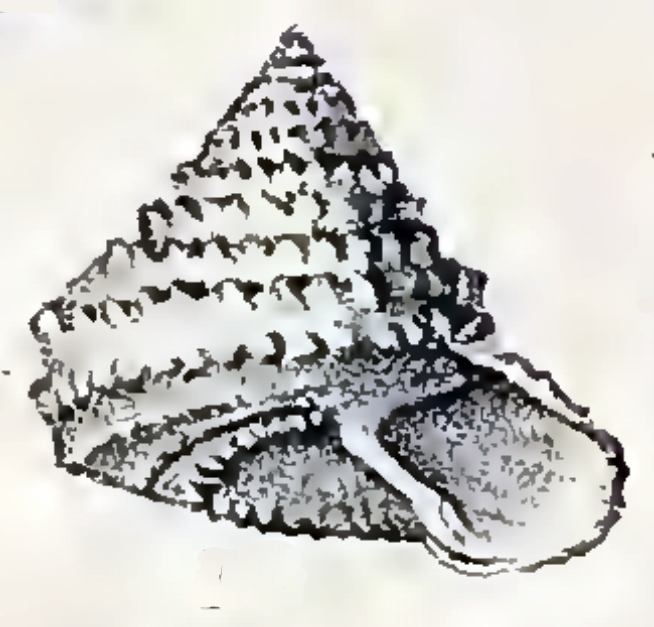
- Drawing with an apertural view of Calliotropis aeglees

Scientific classification
- Kingdom: Animalia
- Phylum: Mollusca
- Class: Gastropoda
- Subclass: Vetigastropoda
- Family: Calliotropidae
- Genus: Calliotropis
- Species: C. aeglees

Binomial name
- Calliotropis aeglees (Watson, 1879)

Synonyms
- Margarita aegleis Watson, 1881; Solariella aeglees Watson, 1879; Solariella aegleis Dall, 1889; Trochus (Margarita) aegleës Watson, 1879 (basionym)

= Calliotropis aeglees =

Species of gastropod

Calliotropis aeglees is a species of sea snail, a marine gastropod mollusk in the family Eucyclidae.

== Description ==
The shell grows to a length of 7.6 mm. The high shell has a broadly conical shape. The color of the shell is pure white when weathered, but apparently slightly brownish when fresh, with a pearly nacre below the thin calcareous surface layer. The shell has a very large umbilicus. It is carinated and ornamented with rows of tubercles. There is a row of small round pointed tubercles a little below the suture. The carina is double, formed by two rather remote tubercled threads, the lower of which runs to the outer lip. Below this one is a broadish furrow and slightly beaded thread, which toward the mouth projects so as to become a third carina. The center of the base has another slightly beaded thread. There is another formed of remote rounded tubercles, defining the umbilicus, within which is a very slight furrow and an ill-defined ridge. The apical whorls are ribbed, but the ribs gradually break into the scarcely connected tubercles of the body whorl. The lines of growth are hardly perceptible, except on the base. The spire is high and very slightly scalar. The sharp apex is minute, flattened on the one side, with the very small embryonic 1¼ whorl rising sharply on the other.

The spire contains 7 whorls, that increase in size regularly. The body whorl is small, from the large part of it cut out by the umbilicus. The whorls are flatly conical and slightly scalar. The suture is linear, but strongly defined by the right-angled junction of the whorl. The oblique aperture is much inclined to the axial line, and rectangularly rounded. The columella and outer lip are parallel. The outer lip is thin and broken, not descending. The inner lip is shortly but flatly bent over the umbilicus, and here it is patulous and sinuated, it then advances in a straight line toward the base. It is toothed in the middle by a strongish spiral protuberance at which point it projects. But from this to the junction with the base it is thin and retreats. The umbilicus is very large, funnel-shaped and pervious.

== Distribution ==
This species is occurs in the Gulf of Mexico and off Puerto Rico
