= Calliotropis calatha =

Scientific classification
- Kingdom: Animalia
- Phylum: Mollusca
- Class: Gastropoda
- Subclass: Vetigastropoda
- Family: Calliotropidae
- Genus: Calliotropis
- Species: C. calatha

Binomial name
- Calliotropis calatha (Dall, 1927)

Synonyms
- Margarita lata Dall, 1889; Solariella calatha Dall, 1927 (basionym)

Species of gastropod

Calliotropis calatha is a species of sea snail, a marine gastropod mollusk in the family Eucyclidae.

== Description ==
The shell grows to a length of 10 mm.

== Distribution ==
This species occurs in the Atlantic Ocean from Georgia to Florida, in the Caribbean Sea, the Gulf of Mexico, and the Lesser Antilles.
