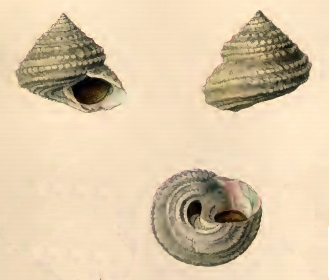
- Original drawing with three views of a shell of Calliotropis valida

Scientific classification
- Kingdom: Animalia
- Phylum: Mollusca
- Class: Gastropoda
- Subclass: Vetigastropoda
- Superfamily: Seguenzioidea
- Family: Calliotropidae
- Genus: Calliotropis
- Species: C. valida

Binomial name
- Calliotropis valida (Dautzenberg & Fischer, 1906)

Synonyms
- Solariella valida Dautzenberg & H. Fischer, 1906

= Calliotropis valida =

Species of gastropod

Calliotropis valida is a species of sea snail, a marine gastropod mollusk in the family Eucyclidae.

== Description ==
The height of the shell attains 16 mm.

== Distribution ==
This species occurs in the Atlantic Ocean off the Cape Verdes.
