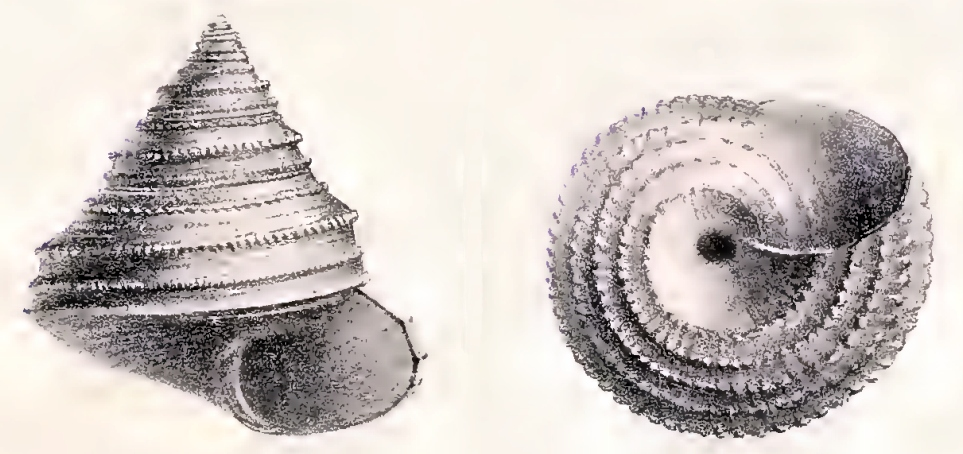
- Drawing with two views of a shell of Calliotropis vaillanti

Scientific classification
- Kingdom: Animalia
- Phylum: Mollusca
- Class: Gastropoda
- Subclass: Vetigastropoda
- Superfamily: Seguenzioidea
- Family: Calliotropidae
- Genus: Calliotropis
- Species: C. vaillanti

Binomial name
- Calliotropis vaillanti (P. Fischer, 1882)

Synonyms
- Solariella vaillanti (P. Fischer, 1882); Trochus vaillanti P. Fischer, 1882

= Calliotropis vaillanti =

Species of gastropod

Calliotropis vaillanti is a species of sea snail, a marine gastropod mollusk in the family Eucyclidae.

== Description ==
The height of the shell attains 8 mm.

== Distribution ==
This species occurs in the Atlantic Ocean off Portugal, the Azores and the Cape Verdes at depths between 495 m and 1,674 m.
