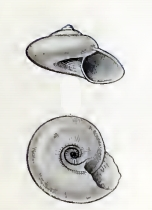
- Ilanga aquamarina (Melvill, 1909); family Solariellidae

Scientific classification
- Kingdom: Animalia
- Phylum: Mollusca
- Class: Gastropoda
- Subclass: Vetigastropoda
- Order: Trochida
- Superfamily: Trochoidea
- Family: Solariellidae; Powell, 1951

Type genus
- Solariella Wood, S.V., 1842

Genera and species
- See text

Synonyms
- Minoliinae Kuroda, Habe & Oyama, 1971; Solariellinae Powell, 1951

= Solariellidae =

Family of gastropods

Solariellidae is a family of small sea snails, marine gastropod mollusks in the superfamily Trochoidea (according to the taxonomy of the Gastropoda by Bouchet & Rocroi, 2005).

This family has no subfamilies. The family consists of extremely diverse species and needs taxonomic revision. The relationship between genera are often uncertain. Many species remain undescribed or have been recently described.

== Description ==
Most species in this family are small, usually up to 10 mm. They show a diverse range of morphologies. The shell has a conical shape with rounded whorls and a wide umbilicus.

== Distribution ==
The species in the family Solariellidae occur worldwide from the sublittoral zone to bathyal depths.

== Genera ==
Genera within the family Solariellidae include:

- Archiminolia Iredale, 1929
- Arxellia Vilvens, Williams & Herbert, 2014
- Bathymophila Dall, 1881
- Chonospeira Herbert & Williams, 2020
- Elaphriella Vilvens & S. T. Williams, 2016
- Fuscomaculina D. G. Herbert, Vilvens & S. T. Williams, 2026
- Galenesia D. G. Herbert & S. T. Williams, 2026
- Ilanga Hebert, 1987
- Lamellitrochus Quinn, 1991
- Microgaza Dall, 1881
- Minolia A. Adams, 1860
- Phragmomphalina D. G. Herbert & S. T. Williams, 2020
- Pseudobathymophila D. G. Herbert & S. T. Williams, 2026
- Solariella S. V. Wood, 1824 - the type genus
- Spectamen Iredale, 1924
- Suavotrochus Dall, 1924
- Zetela Finlay, 1926

Genera brought into synonymy

- Conominolia Finlay 1926 belongs to the family Trochidae.
- Ethaliopsis Schepman, 1908: synonym of Bathymophila Dall, 1881
- Hazuregyra Shikama, 1962: synonym of Minolia A. Adams, 1860
- Machaeroplax Friele, 1877: synonym of Ilanga Hebert, 1987
- Minolops Iredale, 1929: synonym of Spectamen Iredale, 1924
- Zeminolia Finlay, 1926: synonym of Solariella S. Wood, 1842
