= Flavum =

Flavum is a Latin word meaning "yellow". It is often used in taxonomy for species names typically in scientific names for animals and plants to refer to the flower colour or other aspect of the species.

== Animals ==
- Aeromicrobium flavum, Gram-positive facultatively anaerobic and non-motile bacterium from the genus of Aeromicrobium
- Chryseobacterium flavum, Gram-negative, rod-shaped and non-motile bacteria from the genus of Chryseobacterium
- Etheostoma flavum, (saffron darter) a fish species found in Tennessee
- Gnomibidion flavum, species of beetle in the family Cerambycidae
- Lophopoeum w-flavum, species of beetle in the family Cerambycidae
- Microbacterium flavum, Gram-positive and aerobic bacterium from the genus of Microbacterium
- Punctulum flavum, species of minute sea snail, a marine gastropod mollusk or micromollusk in the family Rissoidae
- Oxalicibacterium flavum, Gram-negative, rod-shaped, non-spore-forming, yellow-pigmented, and oxalotrophic bacterium from the genus Oxalicibacterium
- Spectamen flavum, species of sea snail, a marine gastropod mollusk in the family Solariellidae
- Tragiscoschema cor-flavum, species of beetle in the family Cerambycidae
- Tropidion flavum, species of beetle in the family Cerambycidae

== Plants ==
- Allium flavum, ('Small yellow onion') species of onion native to the lands surrounding the Mediterranean, Black, and Caspian Seas
- Arisaema flavum, (Konso litota or panshalla) species of flowering plant widespread across eastern Africa and southern Asia
- Bulbophyllum flavum, species of orchid in the genus Bulbophyllum
- Conophytum flavum, small South African species of succulent plant of the genus Conophytum
- Cypripedium flavum, (the orchid species yellow cypripedium), endemic to China
- Eriogonum flavum, the alpine golden buckwheat, native to northwestern North America
- Glaucium flavum, (yellow hornpoppy or yellow horned poppy) summer flowering plant in the family Papaveraceae, which is native to Northern Africa, Macaronesia, temperate zones in Western Asia and the Caucasus and Europe
- Hymenosporum flavum, (native frangipani) rainforest tree which is native to Queensland and New South Wales in Australia and New Guinea
- Lepidium flavum, (yellow pepperweed) species of flowering plant in the mustard family, it is native to California, Nevada, and Baja California
- Linum flavum, (the golden flax or yellow flax) species of flowering plant in the family Linaceae, native to central and southern Europe
- Pleopsidium flavum, (gold cobblestone lichen) is a distinctively coloured, bright lemon-yellow to chartreuse crustose lichen
- Prasophyllum flavum, (yellow leek orchid) species of orchid endemic to eastern Australia
- Teucrium flavum, (yellow germander)
- Thalictrum flavum, (common meadow-rue, and yellow meadow-rue) flowering plant species in the family Ranunculaceae
- Zanthoxylum flavum, (noyer, West Indian satinwood, yellow sanders, tembetaria, and yellow sandalwood) medium-sized tree in the citrus family, Rutaceae

== See also ==
- Flava (disambiguation), also meaning yellow or blond in Latin
