= C. flavus =

C. flavus may refer to:

- Callionymus flavus, a ray-finned fish species
- Conus flavus, a sea snail species
- Crocus flavus, the Dutch yellow crocus, a plant species found in Europe

== See also ==
- Flavus (disambiguation)
