= L. flavus =

L. flavus may refer to:

- Lasius flavus, the yellow meadow ant, an ant species mostly found in Central Europe
- Limax flavus, the yellow slug, an air-breathing land slug species

== See also ==
- Flavus (disambiguation)
