= Spectamen geruloides =

Scientific classification
- Kingdom: Animalia
- Phylum: Mollusca
- Class: Gastropoda
- Subclass: Vetigastropoda
- Order: Trochida
- Superfamily: Trochoidea
- Family: Solariellidae
- Genus: Spectamen
- Species: S. geruloides

Binomial name
- Spectamen geruloides Herbert, 1987

Synonyms
- Solariella (Solariella) geruloides Herbert, 1987

Species of gastropod

Spectamen geruloides is a species of sea snail, a marine gastropod mollusc in the family Solariellidae.

== Description ==
Like other members of the Spectamen genus, S. geruloides has spiral cord patterns on its shell. It is characterized by broadly rounded cords, intervals with multiple spiral lirae, and weak growth lines, and can be distinguished from the similar S. gerula by its smaller protoconch and greater number of spiral lirae. It can vary in color, but adult shells are typically yellowish-white with axial stripes in shades of brown. Protoconchs are yellowish-white at the apex and otherwise yellowish-brown, while juvenile shells are entirely yellowish-brown. As of 1987, the largest known specimen had a length of 7.7 mm and a diameter of 8.1 mm.

== Distribution ==
S. geruloides occurs from the south coast of KwaZuluNatal to the northeast coast of Transkei, Rep. South Africa.
