= Punctulum =

Scientific classification
- Kingdom: Animalia
- Phylum: Mollusca
- Class: Gastropoda
- Subclass: Caenogastropoda
- Order: Littorinimorpha
- Family: Rissoidae
- Genus: Punctulum; Jeffreys, 1884

Genus of gastropods

Punctulum is a genus of minute sea snails, marine gastropod mollusks or micromollusks in the family Rissoidae.

== Species ==
Species within the genus Punctulum include:

- Punctulum delicatum Golikov & Sirenko, 1998
- Punctulum flavum (Okutani, 1964)
- Punctulum minutum Golikov & Fedjakov, 1987
- Punctulum porcupinae (Gofas & Warén, 1982)
- Punctulum reticulatum Golikov, 1986
- Punctulum wyvillethomsoni (Friele, 1877)

Species brought into synonymy

- Punctulum ochotense Golikov & Sirenko, 1998: synonym of Punctulum flavum (Okutani, 1964)
