= Lophopoeum forsteri =

Scientific classification
- Kingdom: Animalia
- Phylum: Arthropoda
- Class: Insecta
- Order: Coleoptera
- Suborder: Polyphaga
- Infraorder: Cucujiformia
- Family: Cerambycidae
- Genus: Lophopoeum
- Species: L. forsteri

Binomial name
- Lophopoeum forsteri Tippmann, 1960

Species of beetle

Lophopoeum forsteri is a species of beetle in the family Cerambycidae. It was described by Tippmann in 1960.
