= Tragiscoschema inermis =

Scientific classification
- Domain: Eukaryota
- Kingdom: Animalia
- Phylum: Arthropoda
- Class: Insecta
- Order: Coleoptera
- Suborder: Polyphaga
- Infraorder: Cucujiformia
- Family: Cerambycidae
- Genus: Tragiscoschema
- Species: T. inermis

Binomial name
- Tragiscoschema inermis Aurivillius, 1908

Species of beetle

Tragiscoschema inermis is a species of beetle in the family Cerambycidae. It was described by Per Olof Christopher Aurivillius in 1908. It is known from Tanzania and Kenya.
