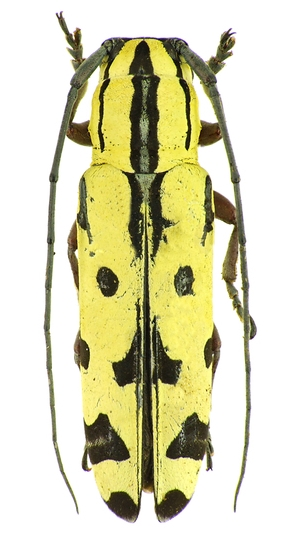

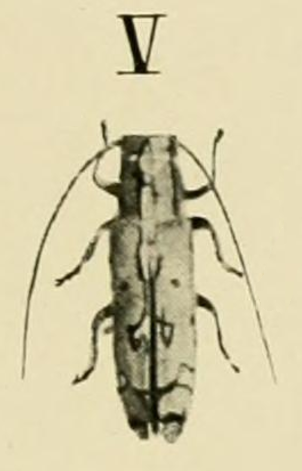

Scientific classification
- Kingdom: Animalia
- Phylum: Arthropoda
- Class: Insecta
- Order: Coleoptera
- Suborder: Polyphaga
- Infraorder: Cucujiformia
- Family: Cerambycidae
- Genus: Tragiscoschema
- Species: T. nigroscriptum

Binomial name
- Tragiscoschema nigroscriptum (Fairmaire, 1897)

Synonyms
- Rhaphidopsis nigroscripta Fairmaire, 1897; Tragiscoshema (Rhaphidopsis) nigro-scriptum Kolbe, 1900

= Tragiscoschema nigroscriptum =

Species of beetle

Tragiscoschema nigroscriptum is a species of beetle in the family Cerambycidae. It was described by Léon Fairmaire in 1897.

Its type locality is Tabora, Tanzania.

It is a minor pest of the cotton plant in Tanzania.
