= Tropidion fernandezi =

Scientific classification
- Kingdom: Animalia
- Phylum: Arthropoda
- Class: Insecta
- Order: Coleoptera
- Suborder: Polyphaga
- Infraorder: Cucujiformia
- Family: Cerambycidae
- Genus: Tropidion
- Species: T. fernandezi

Binomial name
- Tropidion fernandezi Joly, 1991

Species of beetle

Tropidion fernandezi is a species of beetle in the family Cerambycidae. It was described by Joly in 1991.
