= Spectamen tryphenense =

Scientific classification
- Kingdom: Animalia
- Phylum: Mollusca
- Class: Gastropoda
- Subclass: Vetigastropoda
- Order: Trochida
- Superfamily: Trochoidea
- Family: Solariellidae
- Genus: Spectamen
- Species: S. tryphenense

Binomial name
- Spectamen tryphenense (Powell, 1930)

Synonyms
- Solariella tryphenensis (Powell, 1930); Zeminolia tryphenensis Powell, 1930

Species of gastropod

Spectamen tryphenense is a species of sea snail, a marine gastropod mollusk in the family Solariellidae.

== Distribution ==
This marine species is endemic to New Zealand and occurs off the Great Barrier Island.
