= Tropidion pubicolle =

Scientific classification
- Kingdom: Animalia
- Phylum: Arthropoda
- Class: Insecta
- Order: Coleoptera
- Suborder: Polyphaga
- Infraorder: Cucujiformia
- Family: Cerambycidae
- Genus: Tropidion
- Species: T. pubicolle

Binomial name
- Tropidion pubicolle Martins & Napp, 1986

Species of beetle

Tropidion pubicolle is a species of beetle in the family Cerambycidae. It was described by Martins and Napp in 1986.
