= Lophopoeum bruchi =

Scientific classification
- Kingdom: Animalia
- Phylum: Arthropoda
- Class: Insecta
- Order: Coleoptera
- Suborder: Polyphaga
- Infraorder: Cucujiformia
- Family: Cerambycidae
- Genus: Lophopoeum
- Species: L. bruchi

Binomial name
- Lophopoeum bruchi Monné & Martins, 1976

Species of beetle

Lophopoeum bruchi is a species of beetle in the family Cerambycidae. It was described by Monné and Martins in 1976.
