= Tropidion erythrurum =

Scientific classification
- Kingdom: Animalia
- Phylum: Arthropoda
- Class: Insecta
- Order: Coleoptera
- Suborder: Polyphaga
- Infraorder: Cucujiformia
- Family: Cerambycidae
- Genus: Tropidion
- Species: T. erythrurum

Binomial name
- Tropidion erythrurum (Martins, 1962)

Species of beetle

Tropidion erythrurum is a species of beetle in the family Cerambycidae. It was described by Martins in 1962.
