= Spectamen multistriatum =

Scientific classification
- Kingdom: Animalia
- Phylum: Mollusca
- Class: Gastropoda
- Subclass: Vetigastropoda
- Order: Trochida
- Superfamily: Trochoidea
- Family: Solariellidae
- Genus: Spectamen
- Species: S. multistriatum

Binomial name
- Spectamen multistriatum (Thiele, 1925)

Synonyms
- Solariella multistriata Thiele, 1925; Solariella (Solariella) multistriata (Thiele, J., 1925)

Species of gastropod

Spectamen multistriatum is a species of sea snail, a marine gastropod mollusk in the family Solariellidae.

== Description ==
The size of the shell attains 8.5 mm.

== Distribution ==
This marine species occurs off Transkei to Western Cape Province, Rep. South Africa.
