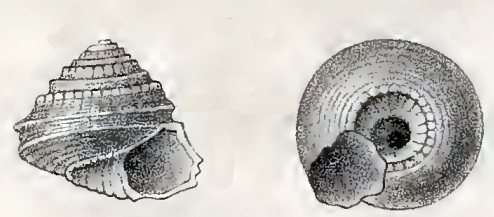
- Drawing with two views of a shell of Spectamen laevior

Scientific classification
- Kingdom: Animalia
- Phylum: Mollusca
- Class: Gastropoda
- Subclass: Vetigastropoda
- Order: Trochida
- Family: Solariellidae
- Genus: Spectamen; Iredale, 1924

Type species
- Trochus philippensis R. B. Watson, 1881

Species
- See text

Synonyms
- Minolops Iredale, 1929 (junior subjective synonym); Solariella (Spectamen) Iredale, 1924 superseded rank; Zeminolia Finlay, 1926

= Spectamen =

Genus of gastropods

Spectamen is a genus of small sea snails, marine gastropod molluscs in the family Solariellidae within the superfamily Trochoidea.

== Distribution ==
This marine genus occurs off Australia, South Africa, Indonesia and the Philippines.

== Species ==
Species within the genus Spectamen include:

- Spectamen adarticulatum (Barnard, 1963)
- Spectamen aratum (Hedley, 1903)
- Spectamen babylonia Vilvens, 2009
- Spectamen basilicum (B. A. Marshall, 1999)
- Spectamen bellulum (Angas, 1869)
- Spectamen benthicola (Powell, 1937)
- † Spectamen carinatum (Laws, 1935)
- Spectamen cinctum (Cotton & Godfrey, 1938)
- Spectamen cinereum (Preston, 1909)
- Spectamen epitheca (Iredale, 1929)
- Spectamen euteium (Vilvens, 2009)
- Spectamen exiguum (B. A. Marshall, 1999)
- Spectamen flavidum (B. A. Marshall, 1999)
- Spectamen flavum (Herbert, 1987)
- † Spectamen fossa (Laws, 1932)
- Spectamen franciscanum (Barnard, 1963)
- Spectamen gertruda (Iredale, 1936)
- Spectamen gerula Herbert, 1987
- Spectamen geruloides Herbert, 1987
- Spectamen laevior (Schepman, 1908)
- † Spectamen lenis (Marwick, 1928)
- Spectamen luteolum (Powell, 1937)
- Spectamen marsus Cotton & Godfrey, 1938
- Spectamen martensi (Herbert, 2015)
- Spectamen multistriatum (Thiele, 1925)
- Spectamen mutabile (Schepman, 1908)
- † Spectamen ordo (Laws, 1941)
- Spectamen pardalis Herbert, 1987
- Spectamen philippense (Watson, 1881)
- Spectamen plicatulum (Murdoch & Suter, 1906)
- Spectamen pulcherrimum (Angas, 1869)
- Spectamen roseapicale Herbert, 1987
- Spectamen rubiolae Herbert, 1987
- Spectamen ruthae Herbert, 1987
- Spectamen semireticulatum (Suter, 1908)
- Spectamen sulculiferum Herbert, 1987
- Spectamen tryphenense (Powell, 1930)
- † Spectamen venustum (P. A. Maxwell, 1969)
- Spectamen verum (Powell, 1937)

Species brought into synonymy

- Spectamen corallinum (Cotton & Godfrey, 1935): synonym of Argalista corallina (Cotton & Godfrey, 1935)
- † Spectamen marshalli P. A. Maxwell, 1992: synonym of † Solariella marshalli (P. A. Maxwell, 1992)
- Spectamen meridianum (Dell, 1953): synonym of Elaphriella meridiana (Dell, 1953)
- Spectamen rikae Vilvens, 2003 has become a Cyclophoridae incertae sedis (terrestrial taxon named as marine)
- Spectamen semisculptum (Martens, 1904): synonym of Zetela semisculpta (E. von Martens, 1904)
- Spectamen turbynei (Barnard, 1963): synonym of Zetela turbynei (Barnard, 1963)
