= Lophopoeum carinatulum =

Scientific classification
- Kingdom: Animalia
- Phylum: Arthropoda
- Class: Insecta
- Order: Coleoptera
- Suborder: Polyphaga
- Infraorder: Cucujiformia
- Family: Cerambycidae
- Genus: Lophopoeum
- Species: L. carinatulum

Binomial name
- Lophopoeum carinatulum Bates, 1863

Species of beetle

Lophopoeum carinatulum is a species of beetle in the family Cerambycidae. It was described by Bates in 1863.
