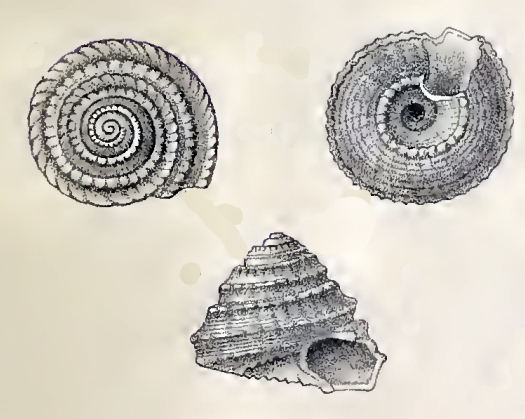
- Original drawing with three views of a shell of Spectamen mutabile

Scientific classification
- Kingdom: Animalia
- Phylum: Mollusca
- Class: Gastropoda
- Subclass: Vetigastropoda
- Order: Trochida
- Superfamily: Trochoidea
- Family: Solariellidae
- Genus: Spectamen
- Species: S. mutabile

Binomial name
- Spectamen mutabile (Schepman, 1908)

Synonyms
- Solariella mutabilis Schepman, 1908

= Spectamen mutabile =

Species of gastropod

Spectamen mutabile is a species of sea snail, a marine gastropod mollusk in the family Solariellidae.

Variety

- Spectamen mutabile var. plicifera (Schepman, 1908)

== Description ==
(Original description by M. Schepman) The height of the shell attains 4¾ mm, its diameter 6 mm. The trochiform shell is moderately strong. it is yellowish, with a rose coloured zone on the upper part of the lower whorls, the upper ones are nacreous. The shell contains 5½ whorls. The nucleus is smooth, followed by a whorl with 4 or 5 raised striae, and by about four ones provided with two distinct keels, of which one, at a little distance from the suture, the other one at the periphery, accompanied on the body whorl by a third keel, at a little distance from the periphery, nearly on the base. These three keels are in typical specimens adorned by sharp nodules, about 30 on the upper keel, 38 on the peripheral one, and 34 on the visible part of the lower one. Moreover, there are 2 raised spiral striae between suture and upper keel, 5 between this and the peripheral one and 2 in the space between periphery and lower keel. This concerns the body whorl; on the upper ones, the finer sculpture disappears gradually. The umbilicus is bordered by a row of coarse, compressed beads, 17 in number. The space between the basal and the umbilical keel contains 5 smooth lirae. The lower whorls have a distinct, nearly horizontal space, from the suture towards the upper keel, with small, radiating plicae, corresponding to the nodules. The spaces above and below the peripheral keel are slightly concave, the suture laying by this construction in a sort of canal. The base of the shell is nearly flat, but slightly convex. The umbilicus is funnel-shaped, rather large, pervious, its wall with raised, concentric and radiating striae, more or less beade. The aperture is rounded-quadrangular, with angles at the ends of the keels, especially of the umbilical one. The margin is sharp. The columella is curved and slightly reflected at the upper part. The interior of aperture is smooth and nacreous. The operculum is many-whorled, outer 2 whorls broad;. The whorlsare sculptured by radiating and concentric striae, causing a latticed appearance, radiating striae stronger on the distal half of each whorl.

== Distribution ==
This marine species occurs off Timor, Indonesia.
