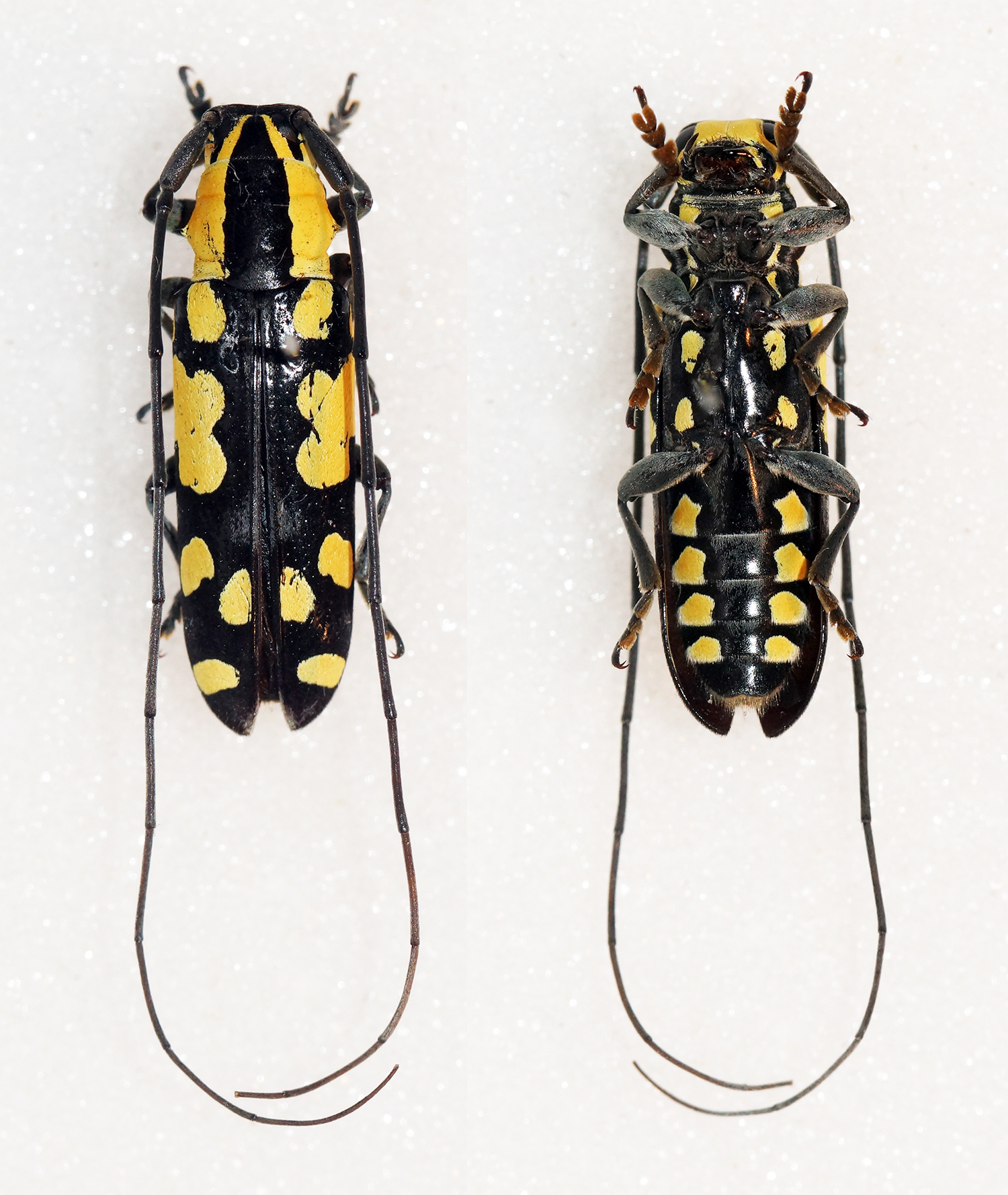

Scientific classification
- Domain: Eukaryota
- Kingdom: Animalia
- Phylum: Arthropoda
- Class: Insecta
- Order: Coleoptera
- Suborder: Polyphaga
- Infraorder: Cucujiformia
- Family: Cerambycidae
- Genus: Tragiscoschema
- Species: T. bertolonii

Binomial name
- Tragiscoschema bertolonii (Thomson, 1857)

Synonyms
- Tragiscus bertolonii Thomson, 1857

= Tragiscoschema bertolonii =

Species of beetle

Tragiscoschema bertolonii is a species of beetle in the family Cerambycidae. It was described by James Thomson in 1857. It is known from Tanzania, South Africa, the Democratic Republic of the Congo, Angola, Mozambique, and Zimbabwe.

The body of T. bertolonii is long and slim. The length is close to 1.3 cm and the antenna is longer than the body. There is a black stripe across the head and body. Yellow marks cover the head and body at the sides.

== Varieties ==
- Tragiscoschema bertolonii var. tenuicorne Thomson, 1865
- Tragiscoschema bertolonii var. amicta Distant, 1869
- Tragiscoschema bertolonii var. wewitschi Paiva, 1862
- Tragiscoschema bertolonii var. wahlbergi Fahraeus, 1872
