= Spectamen ordo =

Scientific classification
- Kingdom: Animalia
- Phylum: Mollusca
- Class: Gastropoda
- Subclass: Vetigastropoda
- Order: Trochida
- Superfamily: Trochoidea
- Family: Solariellidae
- Genus: Spectamen
- Species: †S. ordo

Binomial name
- †Spectamen ordo (Laws, 1941)

Synonyms
- † Solariella ordo (Laws, 1941); † Zeminolia ordo Laws, 1941

Extinct species of gastropod

Spectamen ordo is an extinct species of sea snail, a marine gastropod mollusk, in the family Solariellidae.

== Distribution ==
This marine species occurs in New Zealand.
