= Tropidion carinicolle =

Scientific classification
- Kingdom: Animalia
- Phylum: Arthropoda
- Class: Insecta
- Order: Coleoptera
- Suborder: Polyphaga
- Infraorder: Cucujiformia
- Family: Cerambycidae
- Genus: Tropidion
- Species: T. carinicolle

Binomial name
- Tropidion carinicolle (Bates, 1872)

Species of beetle

Tropidion carinicolle is a species of beetle in the family Cerambycidae. It was described by Henry Walter Bates in 1872.
