= Spectamen basilicum =

Scientific classification
- Kingdom: Animalia
- Phylum: Mollusca
- Class: Gastropoda
- Subclass: Vetigastropoda
- Order: Trochida
- Superfamily: Trochoidea
- Family: Solariellidae
- Genus: Spectamen
- Species: S. basilicum

Binomial name
- Spectamen basilicum (Marshall, 1999)

Synonyms
- Solariella basilica Marshall, 1999

Species of gastropod

Solariella basilica is a species of sea snail, a marine gastropod mollusk in the family Solariellidae. This marine species is endemic to New Zealand and occurs off Three Kings Islands at a depth of 55 m.
