= Flavor =

Flavour or flavor is the sensory perception of taste or smell, or a food flavoring that produces such a perception.

Flavour or flavor may also refer to:

== Science ==
- Flavors (programming language), an early object-oriented extension to Lisp
- Flavour (particle physics), a quantum number of elementary particles related to their weak interactions
- Flavor of Linux, another term for any particular Linux distribution; by extension, "flavor" can be applied to any program or other computer code that exists in more than one current variant at the same time

== Film and TV ==
- Flavors (film), romantic comedy concerning Asian-Indian immigrants in America
- Flavour Network, is a Canadian TV channel with shows about food.

== Music ==
=== Artists and bands ===
- Flavor (band), late 1960s rock band
- Flavor Flav (born 1959), former rap/hip-hop promoter and current reality television actor
- Flavour N'abania (born 1983), Nigerian singer-songwriter

=== Albums ===
- Flavours (album), 1975 album by The Guess Who
- Flavors (album), by American R&B girl group Tiffany Affair

=== Songs ===
- "Flavor", 1994 song by the Jon Spencer Blues Explosion from their album Orange
- "Flavors", a song by Gomez from their 2000 compilation album Abandoned Shopping Trolley Hotline
- "Flavor", 2003 song by Every Little Thing from their album Many Pieces
- "Flavor" (Iyanya song), 2012 single by Iyanya from his album Desire
- "Flavor" (Tori Amos song), 2012 single by Tori Amos from her album Gold Dust
- "The Flavor" (song), a 2015 song by Brandon Bauer featuring Sandhja

== Publishing ==
- The Flavor, an American hip hop magazine published during the 1990s.

== See also ==
- Flava (disambiguation), for an alternative pronunciation of the word
- Deliciousness (TV series), an American comedy clip show
