= Tropidion fairmairei =

Scientific classification
- Kingdom: Animalia
- Phylum: Arthropoda
- Class: Insecta
- Order: Coleoptera
- Suborder: Polyphaga
- Infraorder: Cucujiformia
- Family: Cerambycidae
- Genus: Tropidion
- Species: T. fairmairei

Binomial name
- Tropidion fairmairei (Gounelle, 1909)

Species of beetle

Tropidion fairmairei is a species of beetle in the family Cerambycidae. It was described by Gounelle in 1909.
