= Gnomibidion biacutum =

Scientific classification
- Domain: Eukaryota
- Kingdom: Animalia
- Phylum: Arthropoda
- Class: Insecta
- Order: Coleoptera
- Suborder: Polyphaga
- Infraorder: Cucujiformia
- Family: Cerambycidae
- Genus: Gnomibidion
- Species: G. biacutum

Binomial name
- Gnomibidion biacutum Martins, 1968

Species of beetle

Gnomibidion biacutum is a species of beetle in the family Cerambycidae. It was described by Martins in 1968.
