= Spectamen exiguum =

Scientific classification
- Kingdom: Animalia
- Phylum: Mollusca
- Class: Gastropoda
- Subclass: Vetigastropoda
- Order: Trochida
- Superfamily: Trochoidea
- Family: Solariellidae
- Genus: Spectamen
- Species: S. exiguum

Binomial name
- Spectamen exiguum (Marshall, 1999)

Synonyms
- Solariella exigua Marshall, 1999

Species of gastropod

Spectamen exiguum is a species of sea snail, a marine gastropod mollusk in the family Solariellidae. This marine species is endemic to New Zealand off Three Kings Islands at depths between 42 m and 46 m.
