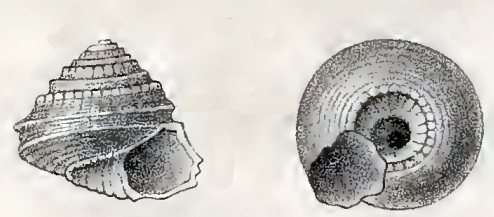
- Original drawing with two views of a shell of Spectamen laevior

Scientific classification
- Kingdom: Animalia
- Phylum: Mollusca
- Class: Gastropoda
- Subclass: Vetigastropoda
- Order: Trochida
- Superfamily: Trochoidea
- Family: Solariellidae
- Genus: Spectamen
- Species: S. laevior

Binomial name
- Spectamen laevior (Schepman, 1908)

Synonyms
- Solariella mutabilis var. laevior Schepman, 1908

= Spectamen laevior =

Species of gastropod

Spectamen laevior is a species of sea snail, a marine gastropod mollusk in the family Solariellidae.

== Description ==
This species was originally considered a variety of Solariella mutabilis (now a synonym of Spectamen mutabilis) with the following different characteristics: the shell with the peripheral and infraperipheral keel quite or nearly smooth (in one instance also the upper keel); the sculpture of the umbilicus more conspicuous. The finer sculpture of the upper part of the whorls and of the base, varies also in some degree, this last one so much, that it is nearly but never quite smooth.

== Distribution ==
This marine species occurs off Timor, Indonesia.
