= Spectamen venustum =

Scientific classification
- Kingdom: Animalia
- Phylum: Mollusca
- Class: Gastropoda
- Subclass: Vetigastropoda
- Order: Trochida
- Superfamily: Trochoidea
- Family: Solariellidae
- Genus: Spectamen
- Species: †S. venustum

Binomial name
- †Spectamen venustum (Maxwell, 1969)

Synonyms
- † Solariella venusta (P. A. Maxwell, 1969) (superseded combination); † Zeminolia venusta P. A. Maxwell, 1969

Extinct species of gastropod

Spectamen venustum is an extinct species of sea snail, a marine gastropod mollusk, in the family Solariellidae.

== Distribution ==
This species occurs in New Zealand.
