= Spectamen adarticulatum =

Scientific classification
- Kingdom: Animalia
- Phylum: Mollusca
- Class: Gastropoda
- Subclass: Vetigastropoda
- Order: Trochida
- Superfamily: Trochoidea
- Family: Solariellidae
- Genus: Spectamen
- Species: S. adarticulatum

Binomial name
- Spectamen adarticulatum (Barnard, 1963)

Synonyms
- Minolia adarticulata Barnard, 1963; Solariella (Solariella) adarticulatum (Barnard, 1963)

Species of gastropod

Spectamen adarticulatum is a species of sea snail, a marine gastropod mollusk in the family Solariellidae.

== Description ==
The size of the shell attains 10 mm.

== Distribution ==
This marine species occurs off KwaZuluNatal, Rep. South Africa.
