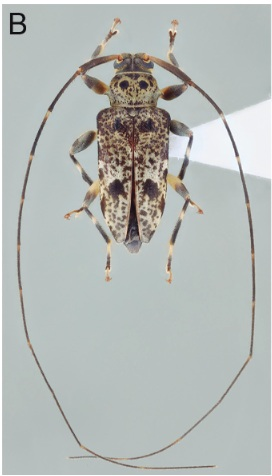

Scientific classification
- Kingdom: Animalia
- Phylum: Arthropoda
- Clade: Pancrustacea
- Class: Insecta
- Order: Coleoptera
- Suborder: Polyphaga
- Infraorder: Cucujiformia
- Family: Cerambycidae
- Genus: Lophopoeum
- Species: L. kawense

Binomial name
- Lophopoeum kawense J.-P. Roguet, 2022

Synonyms
- Lophopoeum paiolai Monné et al., 2023

= Lophopoeum kawense =

Species of beetle

Lophopoeum kawense is a species of beetle of the family Cerambycidae. It is found in French Guiana and Brazil (Amazonas, Rondônia, Minas Gerais).
