= Tropidion flavipenne =

Scientific classification
- Kingdom: Animalia
- Phylum: Arthropoda
- Class: Insecta
- Order: Coleoptera
- Suborder: Polyphaga
- Infraorder: Cucujiformia
- Family: Cerambycidae
- Genus: Tropidion
- Species: T. flavipenne

Binomial name
- Tropidion flavipenne (Martins, 1964)

Species of beetle

Tropidion flavipenne is a species of beetle in the family Cerambycidae. It was described by Martins in 1964.
