= Tropidion extraordinarium =

Scientific classification
- Kingdom: Animalia
- Phylum: Arthropoda
- Class: Insecta
- Order: Coleoptera
- Suborder: Polyphaga
- Infraorder: Cucujiformia
- Family: Cerambycidae
- Genus: Tropidion
- Species: T. extraordinarium

Binomial name
- Tropidion extraordinarium Martins & Galileo, 1999

Species of beetle

Tropidion extraordinarium is a species of beetle in the family Cerambycidae. It was described by Martins and Galileo in 1999.
