= Spectamen sulculiferum =

Scientific classification
- Kingdom: Animalia
- Phylum: Mollusca
- Class: Gastropoda
- Subclass: Vetigastropoda
- Order: Trochida
- Superfamily: Trochoidea
- Family: Solariellidae
- Genus: Spectamen
- Species: S. sulculiferum

Binomial name
- Spectamen sulculiferum Herbert, 1987

Synonyms
- Solariella (Solariella) sulculiferum Herbert, 1987

Species of gastropod

Spectamen sulculiferum is a species of sea snail, a marine gastropod mollusk in the family Solariellidae.

== Description ==
The size of the shell can reach 6.5 mm (0.26 in).

== Distribution ==
This marine species occurs off Transkei, South Africa.
