= Spectamen rubiolae =

Scientific classification
- Kingdom: Animalia
- Phylum: Mollusca
- Class: Gastropoda
- Subclass: Vetigastropoda
- Order: Trochida
- Superfamily: Trochoidea
- Family: Solariellidae
- Genus: Spectamen
- Species: S. rubiolae

Binomial name
- Spectamen rubiolae Herbert, 1987

Synonyms
- Solariella (Solariella) rubiolae Herbert, 1987

Species of gastropod

Spectamen rubiolae is a species of sea snail, a marine gastropod mollusk in the family Solariellidae.

== Description ==
This species was formally described by D.G. Herbert in 1987. Like other members of its genus, S. rubiolae is characterized by its typically small size, with shells rarely exceeding 12 mm in diameter, and can exhibit variable coloration, ranging from monochrome to spotted, mottled, or axially striped patterns. Its natural habitat is marine, occurring specifically off the coast of KwaZulu-Natal to southwest Transkei in the Republic of South Africa, at depths ranging from 65 to 250 meters, with living specimens typically found between 65 and 150 meters.

== Distribution ==
This marine species occurs off KwaZuluNatal to southwest Transkei, Rep. South Africa
