= Spectamen roseapicale =

Scientific classification
- Kingdom: Animalia
- Phylum: Mollusca
- Class: Gastropoda
- Subclass: Vetigastropoda
- Order: Trochida
- Superfamily: Trochoidea
- Family: Solariellidae
- Genus: Spectamen
- Species: S. roseapicale

Binomial name
- Spectamen roseapicale Herbert, 1987

Synonyms
- Solariella (Solariella) roseapicale Herbert, D.G., 1987

Species of gastropod

Spectamen roseapicale is a species of sea snail, a marine gastropod mollusk in the family Solariellidae.

== Description ==
The size of the shell attains 9 mm.

== Distribution ==
This marine species occurs off the Agulhas Bank to East London, Rep. South Africa.
