= Gnomibidion variabile =

Scientific classification
- Domain: Eukaryota
- Kingdom: Animalia
- Phylum: Arthropoda
- Class: Insecta
- Order: Coleoptera
- Suborder: Polyphaga
- Infraorder: Cucujiformia
- Family: Cerambycidae
- Genus: Gnomibidion
- Species: G. variabile

Binomial name
- Gnomibidion variabile Martins & Galileo, 2003

Species of beetle

Gnomibidion variabile is a species of beetle in the family of Cerambycidae. It was first described by Martins and Galileo in 2003.
