= Gnomibidion translucidum =

Scientific classification
- Domain: Eukaryota
- Kingdom: Animalia
- Phylum: Arthropoda
- Class: Insecta
- Order: Coleoptera
- Suborder: Polyphaga
- Infraorder: Cucujiformia
- Family: Cerambycidae
- Genus: Gnomibidion
- Species: G. translucidum

Binomial name
- Gnomibidion translucidum (Martins, 1960)

Species of beetle

Gnomibidion translucidum is a species of beetle in the family Cerambycidae. It was described by Martins in 1960.
