= Lophopoeum freudei =

Scientific classification
- Kingdom: Animalia
- Phylum: Arthropoda
- Class: Insecta
- Order: Coleoptera
- Suborder: Polyphaga
- Infraorder: Cucujiformia
- Family: Cerambycidae
- Genus: Lophopoeum
- Species: L. freudei

Binomial name
- Lophopoeum freudei (Gilmour, 1959)

Species of beetle

Lophopoeum freudei is a species of beetle in the family Cerambycidae. It was described by Gilmour in 1959.
