= Tropidion brunniceps =

Scientific classification
- Kingdom: Animalia
- Phylum: Arthropoda
- Class: Insecta
- Order: Coleoptera
- Suborder: Polyphaga
- Infraorder: Cucujiformia
- Family: Cerambycidae
- Genus: Tropidion
- Species: T. brunniceps

Binomial name
- Tropidion brunniceps (Thomson, 1865)

Species of beetle

Tropidion brunniceps is a species of beetle in the family Cerambycidae. It was described by Thomson in 1865.
