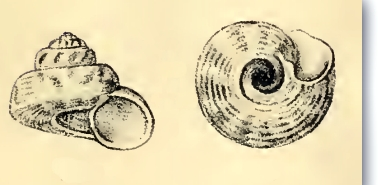
- Drawing with two views of a shell of Spectamen philippense

Scientific classification
- Kingdom: Animalia
- Phylum: Mollusca
- Class: Gastropoda
- Subclass: Vetigastropoda
- Order: Trochida
- Superfamily: Trochoidea
- Family: Solariellidae
- Genus: Spectamen
- Species: S. philippense

Binomial name
- Spectamen philippense (Watson, 1881)

Synonyms
- Monilea philippensis (Watson, 1881); Solariella (Solariella) philippensis (R.B. Watson, 1881); Trochus (Solariella) philippensis R. B. Watson, 1881 (original combination)

= Spectamen philippense =

Species of gastropod

Spectamen philippense is a species of small sea snail, a marine gastropod mollusk in the family Solariellidae.

== Description ==
The size of the shell attains 8 mm. The shell has a trochiform shape with a broad base, more conical and less scalar, with a large open umbilicus and brilliant color.

Sculpture: the shell is gathered into small regular flat puckers below the suture. These are weaker on the body whorl. The whole surface is covered with very fine oblique longitudinal striae.

Spirals: there are very numerous fine, sharp, undulating scratches, which on the middle of the base are shallower and wider apart, but toward the umbilicus again become sharper and more crowded. Within the umbilicus are four or five somewhat beaded spirals, the first and strongest of which forms an umbilical carina.

The color of the shell is faintly iridescent all over, creamy white, flecked with zigzag lines of crimson, which on the upper whorls are narrow and regular, on the penultimate whorl are remote, and on the last are irregular, broken and crowded. On the base there are eleven to twelve elongated radiating crimson spots. The first three whorls are a pale orange-yellow.

The spire is rather high, scalar. The apex is small, bluntly pointed. The 6½ whorls show a flat shelf below the suture, angulated at about one-fifth of their breadth, and rounded from the angulation to the suture. The body whorl is bluntly angulated at the edge of the rounded base. The suture is strong, being slightly impressed and very distinctly marked by the angle at which the adjoining whorls meet. The round aperture is a little oblique. The outer lip is thin and sharp, not at all expanded. The inner lip is thin and sharp, a very little patulous on the columella, where it also retreats a little, so as to form a slight open sinus. The shell is brilliantly iridescent within. The umbilicus is wide and pervious, and deeply impressed at the suture, which runs spirally up to the apex within.

== Distribution ==
This marine species is endemic to Australia and occurs off Queensland, New South Wales and Tasmania.
