= Tropidion abditum =

Scientific classification
- Kingdom: Animalia
- Phylum: Arthropoda
- Class: Insecta
- Order: Coleoptera
- Suborder: Polyphaga
- Infraorder: Cucujiformia
- Family: Cerambycidae
- Genus: Tropidion
- Species: T. abditum

Binomial name
- Tropidion abditum Martins, 1968

Species of beetle

Tropidion abditum is a species of beetle in the family Cerambycidae. It was described by Martins in 1968.
