= Spectamen plicatulum =

Scientific classification
- Kingdom: Animalia
- Phylum: Mollusca
- Class: Gastropoda
- Subclass: Vetigastropoda
- Order: Trochida
- Superfamily: Trochoidea
- Family: Solariellidae
- Genus: Spectamen
- Species: S. plicatulum

Binomial name
- Spectamen plicatulum (Murdoch & Suter, 1906)

Synonyms
- Isanda (Zeminolia) plicatula Wenz, 1938; Minolia plicatula Murdoch & Suter, 1906; Monilea (Minolia) plicatula Suter, 1913; Solariella plicatula (Murdoch & Suter, 1906); Spectamen verum Powell, 1979; Zeminolia plicatula Finlay, 1926

Species of gastropod

Spectamen plicatulum is a species of sea snail, a marine gastropod mollusk in the family Solariellidae.

== Description ==
The height of the shell attains 4 mm, its diameter is 6 mm. This species differs from the characteristics of the genus in having the longitudinal plications upon the upper part of the body whorl almost obsolete, and the two circumumbilical carinae are almost smooth.

== Distribution ==
This marine species is endemic to New Zealand.
