= Gnomibidion digrammum =

Scientific classification
- Domain: Eukaryota
- Kingdom: Animalia
- Phylum: Arthropoda
- Class: Insecta
- Order: Coleoptera
- Suborder: Polyphaga
- Infraorder: Cucujiformia
- Family: Cerambycidae
- Genus: Gnomibidion
- Species: G. digrammum

Binomial name
- Gnomibidion digrammum (Bates, 1870)

Species of beetle

Gnomibidion digrammum is a species of beetle in the family Cerambycidae. It was described by Bates in 1870.
