= Tropidion calciope =

Scientific classification
- Kingdom: Animalia
- Phylum: Arthropoda
- Class: Insecta
- Order: Coleoptera
- Suborder: Polyphaga
- Infraorder: Cucujiformia
- Family: Cerambycidae
- Genus: Tropidion
- Species: T. calciope

Binomial name
- Tropidion calciope (Thomson, 1867)

Species of beetle

Tropidion calciope is a species of beetle in the family Cerambycidae. It was described by Thomson in 1867.
