= Lophopoeum meridianum =

Scientific classification
- Kingdom: Animalia
- Phylum: Arthropoda
- Clade: Pancrustacea
- Class: Insecta
- Order: Coleoptera
- Suborder: Polyphaga
- Infraorder: Cucujiformia
- Family: Cerambycidae
- Genus: Lophopoeum
- Species: L. meridianum

Binomial name
- Lophopoeum meridianum Fisher, 1938

Species of beetle

Lophopoeum meridianum is a species of beetle in the family Cerambycidae. It was described by Fisher in 1938. It is found in Brazil (Minas Gerais, Espírito Santo, Rio de Janeiro, São Paulo, Santa Catarina).
