= Tropidion signatum =

Scientific classification
- Kingdom: Animalia
- Phylum: Arthropoda
- Class: Insecta
- Order: Coleoptera
- Suborder: Polyphaga
- Infraorder: Cucujiformia
- Family: Cerambycidae
- Genus: Tropidion
- Species: T. signatum

Binomial name
- Tropidion signatum (Audinet-Serville, 1834)

Species of beetle

Tropidion signatum is a species of beetle in the family Cerambycidae. It was described by Audinet-Serville in 1834.
