= Tropidion =

Scientific classification
- Domain: Eukaryota
- Kingdom: Animalia
- Phylum: Arthropoda
- Class: Insecta
- Order: Coleoptera
- Suborder: Polyphaga
- Infraorder: Cucujiformia
- Family: Cerambycidae
- Subfamily: Cerambycinae
- Tribe: Ibidionini
- Genus: Tropidion; Thomson, 1867

Genus of beetles

Tropidion is a genus of beetles in the family Cerambycidae, containing the following species:

- Tropidion abditum Martins, 1968
- Tropidion acanthonotum (Martins, 1962)
- Tropidion argentina Galileo & Martins, 2010
- Tropidion atricolle (Martins, 1962)
- Tropidion aurulentum Martins, 1971
- Tropidion balfourbrownei Martins, 1968
- Tropidion batesi Martins, 1968
- Tropidion bituberculatum (Audinet-Serville, 1834)
- Tropidion boliviensis Galileo & Martins, 2010
- Tropidion breviusculum (Thomson, 1867)
- Tropidion brunniceps (Thomson, 1865)
- Tropidion calciope (Thomson, 1867)
- Tropidion carinicolle (Bates, 1872)
- Tropidion castaneum Martins, 1968
- Tropidion centrale (Martins, 1962)
- Tropidion cinctulum (Bates, 1870)
- Tropidion citrinum Martins, 1968
- Tropidion contortum Martins, 1968
- Tropidion cruentum Martins & Napp, 1986
- Tropidion ecoparaba Martins & Galileo, 2007
- Tropidion elegans (Gounelle, 1909)
- Tropidion enochrum Martins, 1968
- Tropidion epaphum (Berg, 1889)
- Tropidion erythrurum (Martins, 1962)
- Tropidion extraordinarium Martins & Galileo, 1999
- Tropidion fairmairei (Gounelle, 1909)
- Tropidion fernandezi Joly, 1991
- Tropidion festivum (Martins, 1962)
- Tropidion flavipenne (Martins, 1964)
- Tropidion flavipes (Thomson, 1867)
- Tropidion flavum (Martins, 1962)
- Tropidion fuscipenne (Gounelle, 1913)
- Tropidion hermione (Thomson, 1867)
- Tropidion hispidum Martins, 1971
- Tropidion igneicolle (Martins, 1962)
- Tropidion inerme (Martins, 1962)
- Tropidion intermedium (Martins, 1962)
- Tropidion investitum (Martins, 1962)
- Tropidion iuba Martins & Galileo, 2007
- Tropidion kjellanderi (Martins, 1965)
- Tropidion lepidum Martins, 1971
- Tropidion litigiosum Martins, 1968
- Tropidion mirabile Martins, 1971
- Tropidion nordestinum (Martins, 1962)
- Tropidion obesum Martins, 1968
- Tropidion ochraceum Martins & Galileo, 2007
- Tropidion periboeoides (Thomson, 1867)
- Tropidion persimile (Martins, 1960)
- Tropidion personatum (Gounelle, 1909)
- Tropidion pictipenne (Martins, 1962)
- Tropidion pinima Martins & Galileo, 2007
- Tropidion praecipuum Martins, 1971
- Tropidion pubicolle Martins & Napp, 1986
- Tropidion pulvinum Martins, 1968
- Tropidion pusillum (Martins, 1960)
- Tropidion rubricatum (Gounelle, 1909)
- Tropidion rusticum (Gounelle, 1909)
- Tropidion salamis (Thomson, 1867)
- Tropidion semirufum Martins, 1968
- Tropidion signatum (Audinet-Serville, 1834)
- Tropidion silvestre (Martins, 1965)
- Tropidion sipolisi (Gounelle, 1909)
- Tropidion subcruciatum (White, 1855)
- Tropidion supernotatum (Gounelle, 1909)
- Tropidion tendyra Martins & Galileo, 2007
- Tropidion tymauna Martins & Galileo, 2007
- Tropidion validum (Martins, 1962)
- Tropidion vianai Martins, 1971
- Tropidion vicinum (Gounelle, 1913)
- Tropidion xanthocele (Martins, 1962)
- Tropidion zonapterum (Martins, 1962)
