= Tropidion vicinum =

Scientific classification
- Kingdom: Animalia
- Phylum: Arthropoda
- Class: Insecta
- Order: Coleoptera
- Suborder: Polyphaga
- Infraorder: Cucujiformia
- Family: Cerambycidae
- Genus: Tropidion
- Species: T. vicinum

Binomial name
- Tropidion vicinum (Gounelle, 1913)

Species of beetle

Tropidion vicinum is a species of beetle in the family Cerambycidae. It was described by Gounelle in 1913.
