= Tropidion boliviensis =

Scientific classification
- Kingdom: Animalia
- Phylum: Arthropoda
- Class: Insecta
- Order: Coleoptera
- Suborder: Polyphaga
- Infraorder: Cucujiformia
- Family: Cerambycidae
- Genus: Tropidion
- Species: T. boliviensis

Binomial name
- Tropidion boliviensis Galileo & Martins, 2010

Species of beetle

Tropidion boliviensis is a species of beetle in the family Cerambycidae. It was described by Galileo and Martins in 2010.
