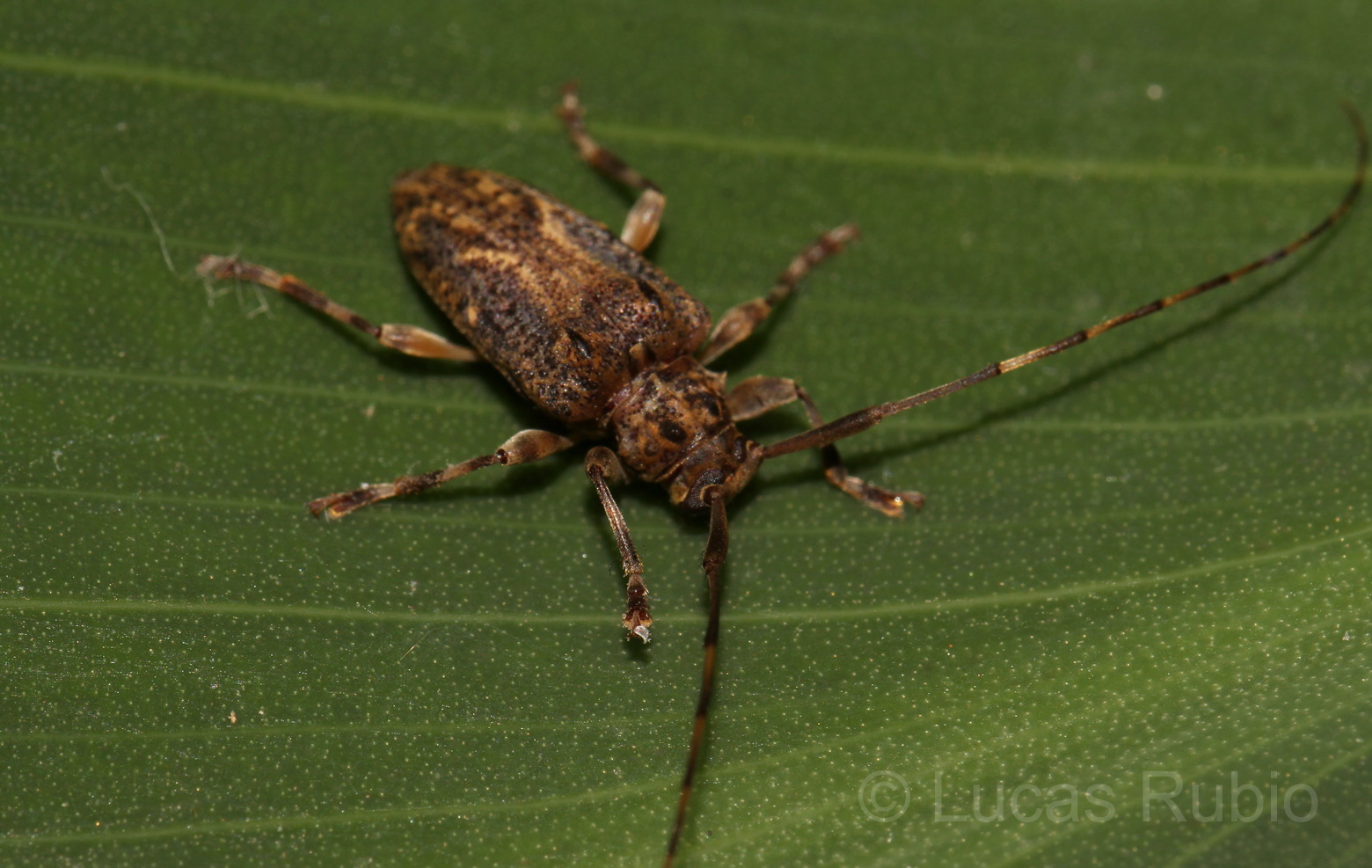
- Lophopoeum timbouvae

Scientific classification
- Kingdom: Animalia
- Phylum: Arthropoda
- Clade: Pancrustacea
- Class: Insecta
- Order: Coleoptera
- Suborder: Polyphaga
- Infraorder: Cucujiformia
- Family: Cerambycidae
- Tribe: Acanthocinini
- Genus: Lophopoeum

= Lophopoeum =

Genus of beetles

Lophopoeum is a genus of beetles in the family Cerambycidae, containing the following species:

- Lophopoeum bituberculatum (White, 1855)
- Lophopoeum bruchi Monné & Martins, 1976
- Lophopoeum carinatulum Bates, 1863
- Lophopoeum centromaculatum Monné & Martins, 1976
- Lophopoeum circumflexum Bates, 1863
- Lophopoeum forsteri Tippmann, 1960
- Lophopoeum freudei (Gilmour, 1959)
- Lophopoeum fuliginosum Bates, 1863
- Lophopoeum humerosum Monné & Martins, 1976
- Lophopoeum kawense J.-P. Roguet, 2022
- Lophopoeum meridianum Fisher, 1938
- Lophopoeum monticulum Monné & Martins, 1976
- Lophopoeum saronotum Bates, 1872
- Lophopoeum scopiferum Bates, 1872
- Lophopoeum timbouvae Lameere, 1884
- Lophopoeum w-flavum Bates, 1885
