= Flava =

Flava, Latin for 'yellow', may refer to:

- Flava (radio), a New Zealand radio station
- "Flava" (song), a single from R&B singer-songwriter Peter Andre
- Flava (TV channel), a defunct British music television channel, which played classic hip-hop and R&B music videos.
- Flavor (disambiguation), in English slang

== See also ==
- Flavas, an American line of fashion dolls created by Mattel in 2003
- Flavus (disambiguation)
- Flavum (disambiguation)
