= Gnomibidion araujoi =

Scientific classification
- Domain: Eukaryota
- Kingdom: Animalia
- Phylum: Arthropoda
- Class: Insecta
- Order: Coleoptera
- Suborder: Polyphaga
- Infraorder: Cucujiformia
- Family: Cerambycidae
- Genus: Gnomibidion
- Species: G. araujoi

Binomial name
- Gnomibidion araujoi (Martins, 1962)

Species of beetle

Gnomibidion araujoi is a species of beetle in the family Cerambycidae. It was described by Martins in 1962.
