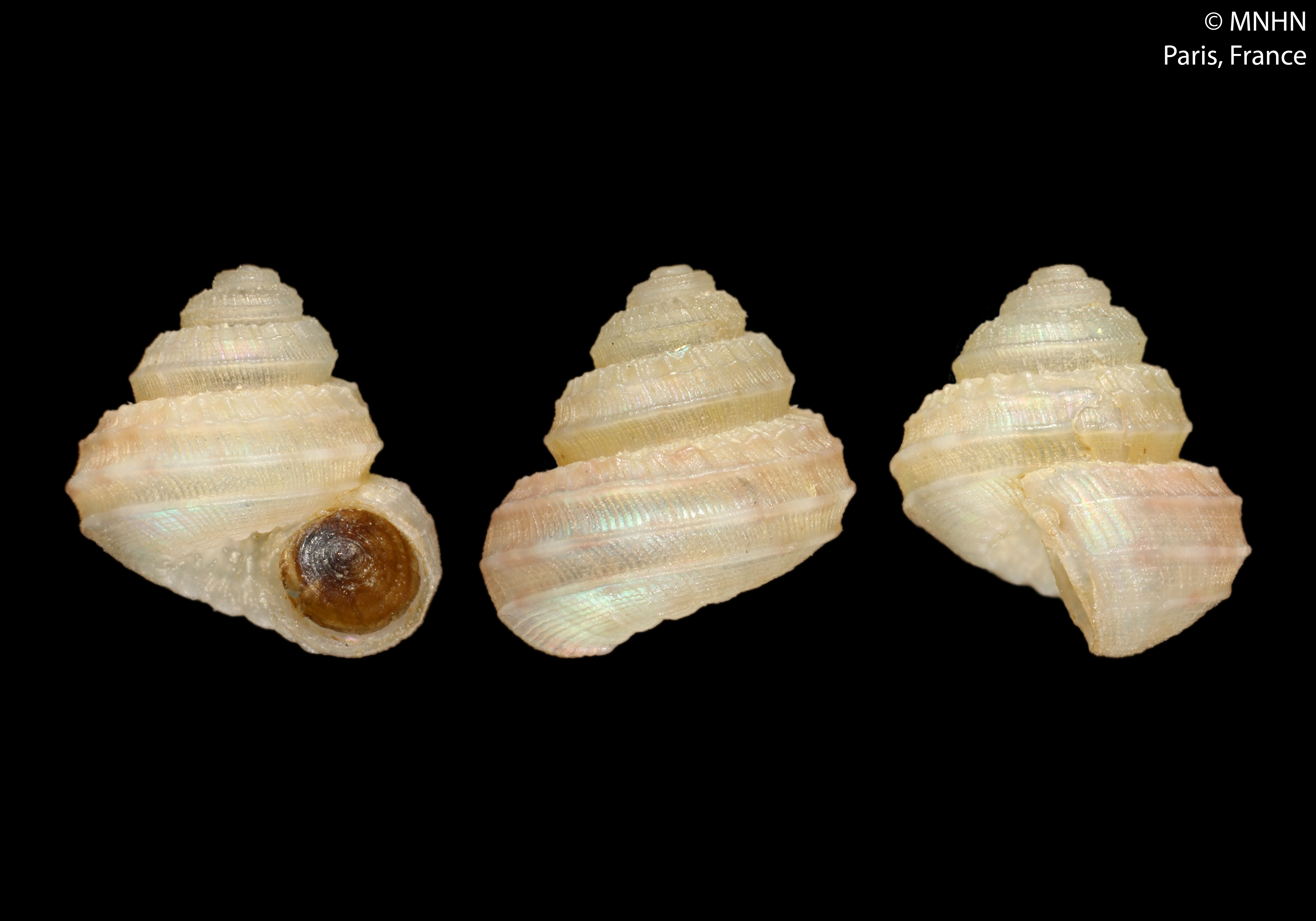
- Shell of Spectamen babylonia (holotype at MNHN, Paris)

Scientific classification
- Kingdom: Animalia
- Phylum: Mollusca
- Class: Gastropoda
- Subclass: Vetigastropoda
- Order: Trochida
- Family: Solariellidae
- Genus: Spectamen
- Species: S. babylonia

Binomial name
- Spectamen babylonia Vilvens, 2009

= Spectamen babylonia =

Species of gastropod

Spectamen babylonia is a species of small sea snail, a marine gastropod mollusk in the family Solariellidae.

== Description ==
The size of the shell attains 3.9 mm.

== Distribution ==
This marine species occurs off Indonesia.
