= Spectamen flavidum =

Scientific classification
- Kingdom: Animalia
- Phylum: Mollusca
- Class: Gastropoda
- Subclass: Vetigastropoda
- Order: Trochida
- Superfamily: Trochoidea
- Family: Solariellidae
- Genus: Spectamen
- Species: S. flavidum

Binomial name
- Spectamen flavidum (Marshall, 1999)

Synonyms
- Solariella flavida Marshall, 1999

Species of gastropod

Spectamen flavidum is a species of sea snail, a marine gastropod mollusk in the family Solariellidae. The height of the shell attains 3.5 mm, its
