= Spectamen verum =

Scientific classification
- Kingdom: Animalia
- Phylum: Mollusca
- Class: Gastropoda
- Subclass: Vetigastropoda
- Order: Trochida
- Superfamily: Trochoidea
- Family: Solariellidae
- Genus: Spectamen
- Species: S. verum

Binomial name
- Spectamen verum (Powell, 1937)

Synonyms
- Solariella vera (Powel, 1937); Zeminolia vera Powel, 1937

Species of gastropod

Spectamen verum is a species of sea snail, a marine gastropod mollusk in the family Solariellidae. This marine species is endemic to New Zealand and occurs off the Three Kings Islands at a depth of 549 m.
