= Spectamen martensi =

Scientific classification
- Kingdom: Animalia
- Phylum: Mollusca
- Class: Gastropoda
- Subclass: Vetigastropoda
- Order: Trochida
- Superfamily: Trochoidea
- Family: Solariellidae
- Genus: Spectamen
- Species: S. martensi

Binomial name
- Spectamen martensi Herbert, 2015

Species of gastropod

Spectamen martensi is a species of sea snail, a marine gastropod mollusk, in the family Solariellidae.

== Distribution ==
This species occurs in the following locations:

- Eastern Cape, province of the
- KwaZulu-Natal
