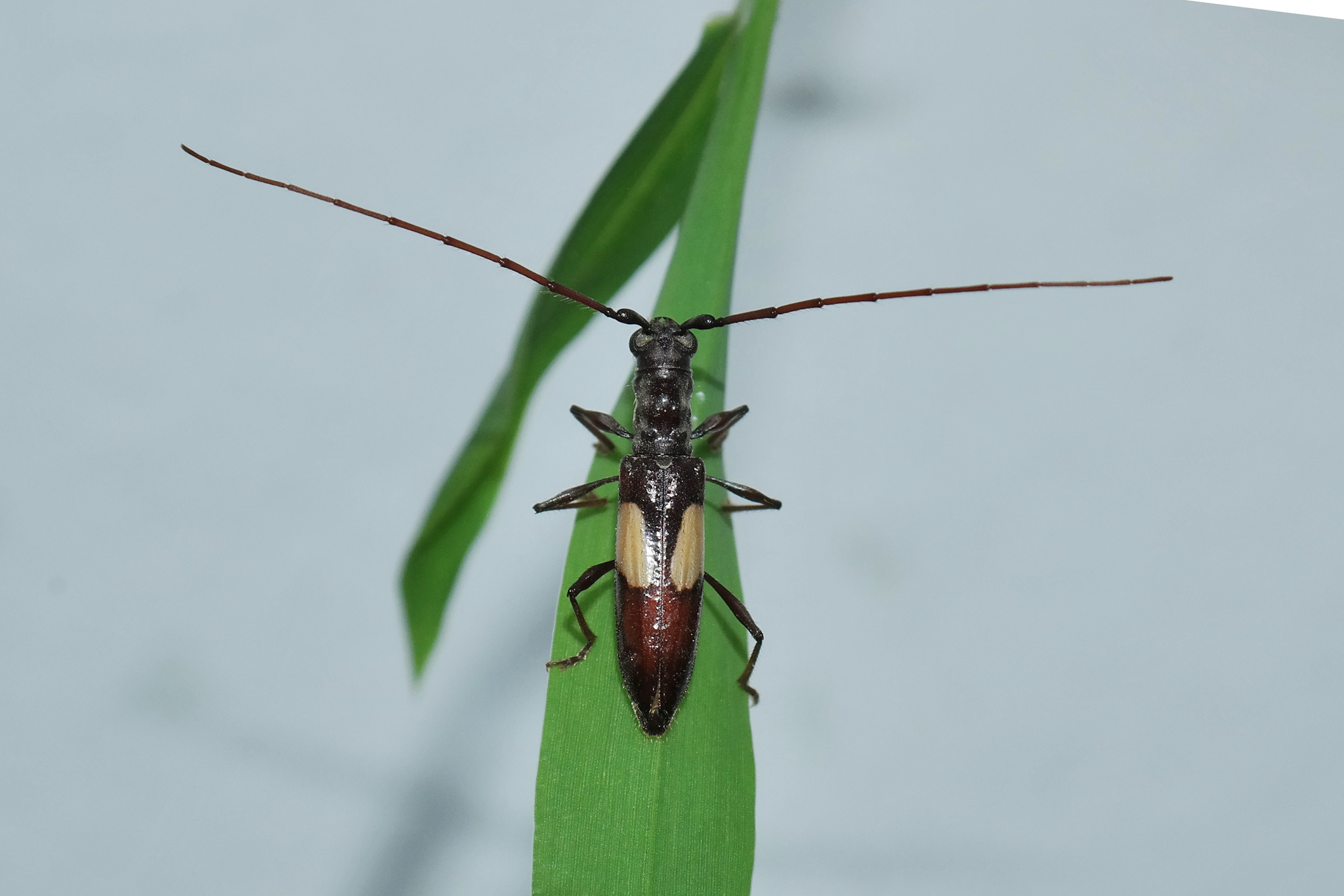

Scientific classification
- Kingdom: Animalia
- Phylum: Arthropoda
- Clade: Pancrustacea
- Class: Insecta
- Order: Coleoptera
- Suborder: Polyphaga
- Infraorder: Cucujiformia
- Family: Cerambycidae
- Genus: Gnomibidion
- Species: G. fulvipes

Binomial name
- Gnomibidion fulvipes (Thomson, 1865)

= Gnomibidion fulvipes =

Species of beetle

Gnomibidion fulvipes is a species of beetle in the family Cerambycidae. It was described by Thomson in 1865. It is found in French Guiana, Venezuela, Peru (Loreto), Brazil (Acre, Pará, Rondônia, Mato Grosso, Goiás, Mato Grosso do Sul, Maranhão, Piauí, Pernambuco, Ceará, Bahia, Minas Gerais, Espírito Santo, Rio de Janeiro, São Paulo, Paraná, Santa Catarina, Rio Grande do Sul), Bolivia (Santa Cruz, Tarija), Paraguay, Argentina (Salta, Chaco, Formosa, Misiones, Corrientes) and Uruguay.
