= Tragiscoschema holdhausi =

Scientific classification
- Domain: Eukaryota
- Kingdom: Animalia
- Phylum: Arthropoda
- Class: Insecta
- Order: Coleoptera
- Suborder: Polyphaga
- Infraorder: Cucujiformia
- Family: Cerambycidae
- Genus: Tragiscoschema
- Species: T. holdhausi

Binomial name
- Tragiscoschema holdhausi Itzinger, 1934

Species of beetle

Tragiscoschema holdhausi is a species of beetle in the family Cerambycidae. It was described by Itzinger in 1934.
