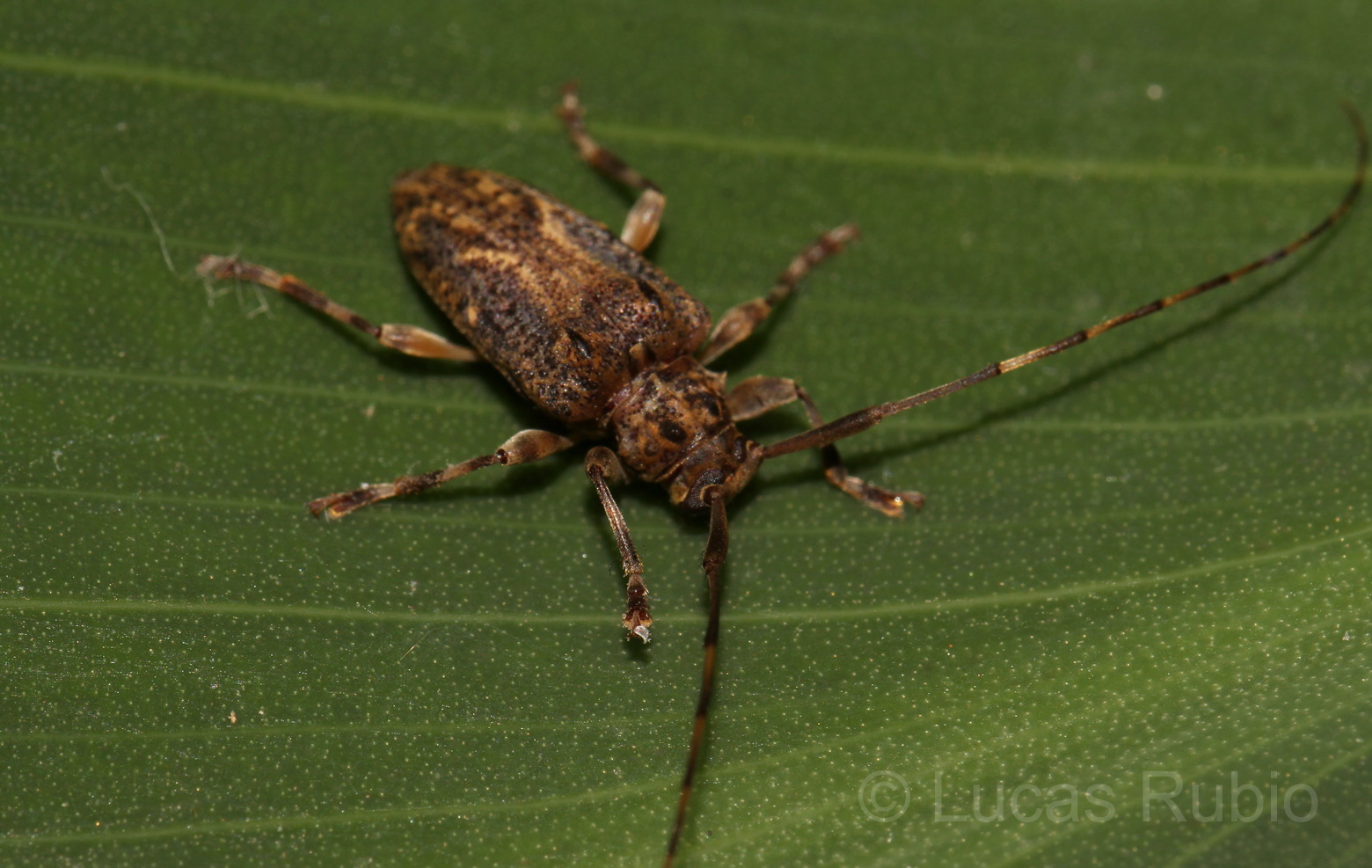

Scientific classification
- Kingdom: Animalia
- Phylum: Arthropoda
- Class: Insecta
- Order: Coleoptera
- Suborder: Polyphaga
- Infraorder: Cucujiformia
- Family: Cerambycidae
- Genus: Lophopoeum
- Species: L. timbouvae

Binomial name
- Lophopoeum timbouvae Lameere, 1884

= Lophopoeum timbouvae =

Species of beetle

Lophopoeum timbouvae is a species of beetle in the family Cerambycidae. It was described by Lameere in 1884.
