= Lophopoeum scopiferum =

Scientific classification
- Kingdom: Animalia
- Phylum: Arthropoda
- Class: Insecta
- Order: Coleoptera
- Suborder: Polyphaga
- Infraorder: Cucujiformia
- Family: Cerambycidae
- Genus: Lophopoeum
- Species: L. scopiferum

Binomial name
- Lophopoeum scopiferum Bates, 1872

Species of beetle

Lophopoeum scopiferum is a species of beetle in the family Cerambycidae. It was described by Bates in 1872.
