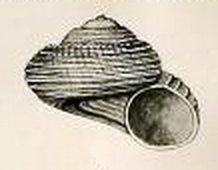
- Original drawing of a shell of Spectamen semireticulatum

Scientific classification
- Kingdom: Animalia
- Phylum: Mollusca
- Class: Gastropoda
- Subclass: Vetigastropoda
- Order: Trochida
- Superfamily: Trochoidea
- Family: Solariellidae
- Genus: Spectamen
- Species: S. semireticulatum

Binomial name
- Spectamen semireticulatum (Suter, 1908)

Synonyms
- Monilea (Minolia) semireticulata Suter, 1908; Solariella semireticulata (Suter, 1908); Spectamen semireticulata Powell, 1926; Zeminolia reticulata Finlay, 1926

= Spectamen semireticulatum =

Species of gastropod

Spectamen semireticulatum is a species of sea snail, a marine gastropod mollusc in the family Solariellidae.

== Description ==
(Original description by H. Suter) The height of the shell attains 3.2 mm, its diameter 5 mm. The small, thin and fragile, umbilicate shell has a depressed turbinate shape. It is spirally lirate. The sculpture consistis of numerous slightly elevated and rounded spiral cinguli; 6 on the penultimate, about 16 on the body whorl. Those on the upper surface show a fine spiral thread in the interstices, which are of about the same width as the riblets. The cinguli on the outer side of the base are finer and closer together. On the inner side 3 broad slightly crenulated ribs surround the umbilicus, which is also prominently spirally ribbed. The 2 cinguli below the suture are crossed and beaded by strong and sharp equidistant radiate riblets, dividing the interstices into regular squares. The remainder of the whorls show fine growth lines. The colour of the shell is whitish, light horny. The spire is low, with convex outlines, very little higher than the aperture. The apex is rather blunt. The protoconch is small, globular and consists of one smooth and convex whorl. The four whorls increase rather rapidly. They are somewhat flattened below the suture, then convex. The base of the shell is convex. The suture is subcanaliculate. The aperture is circular and slightly iridescent within. The peristome is sharp, the ends approaching and nearly meeting. They are united by a white parietal callosity. The columella is vertical, arcuate, and slightly expanded. The umbilicus is about one-third of the diameter, deep and scalar.

== Distribution ==
This marine species is endemic to New Zealand and occurs off Snares Island at a depth of 91 m.
