= Spectamen marsus =

Scientific classification
- Kingdom: Animalia
- Phylum: Mollusca
- Class: Gastropoda
- Subclass: Vetigastropoda
- Order: Trochida
- Superfamily: Trochoidea
- Family: Solariellidae
- Genus: Spectamen
- Species: S. marsus

Binomial name
- Spectamen marsus Cotton & Godfrey, 1938

Species of gastropod

Spectamen marsus, common name the streaked top shell, is a species of sea snail, a marine gastropod mollusk in the family Solariellidae.

== Description ==
The size of the shell attains 5 mm.

== Distribution ==
This marine species is endemic to Australia and occurs off South Australia and Western Australia.
