= Tragiscoschema amabile =

Scientific classification
- Domain: Eukaryota
- Kingdom: Animalia
- Phylum: Arthropoda
- Class: Insecta
- Order: Coleoptera
- Suborder: Polyphaga
- Infraorder: Cucujiformia
- Family: Cerambycidae
- Genus: Tragiscoschema
- Species: T. amabile

Binomial name
- Tragiscoschema amabile (Perroud, 1855)

Synonyms
- Tragocephala amabilis Perroud, 1855; Tragiscoschema gracilicornis Chevrolat, 1858; Tragiscus lascivus Thomson, 1857

Species of beetle

Tragiscoschema amabile is a species of beetle in the family Cerambycidae. It was described by Perroud in 1855, originally as "Tragocephala amabilis".
