= Punctulum wyvillethomsoni =

Scientific classification
- Kingdom: Animalia
- Phylum: Mollusca
- Class: Gastropoda
- Subclass: Caenogastropoda
- Order: Littorinimorpha
- Family: Rissoidae
- Genus: Punctulum
- Species: P. wyvillethomsoni

Binomial name
- Punctulum wyvillethomsoni (Friele, 1877)

Synonyms
- Alvania wyvillethomsoni (Friele, 1877)

Species of gastropod

Punctulum wyvillethomsoni is a species of small sea snail, a marine gastropod mollusk or micromollusk in the family Rissoidae.

== Distribution ==
This species occurs in European waters and in the Northwest Atlantic Ocean.

== Description ==
The maximum recorded shell length is 3.8 mm.

== Habitat ==
Minimum recorded depth is 95 m. Maximum recorded depth is 300 m.
