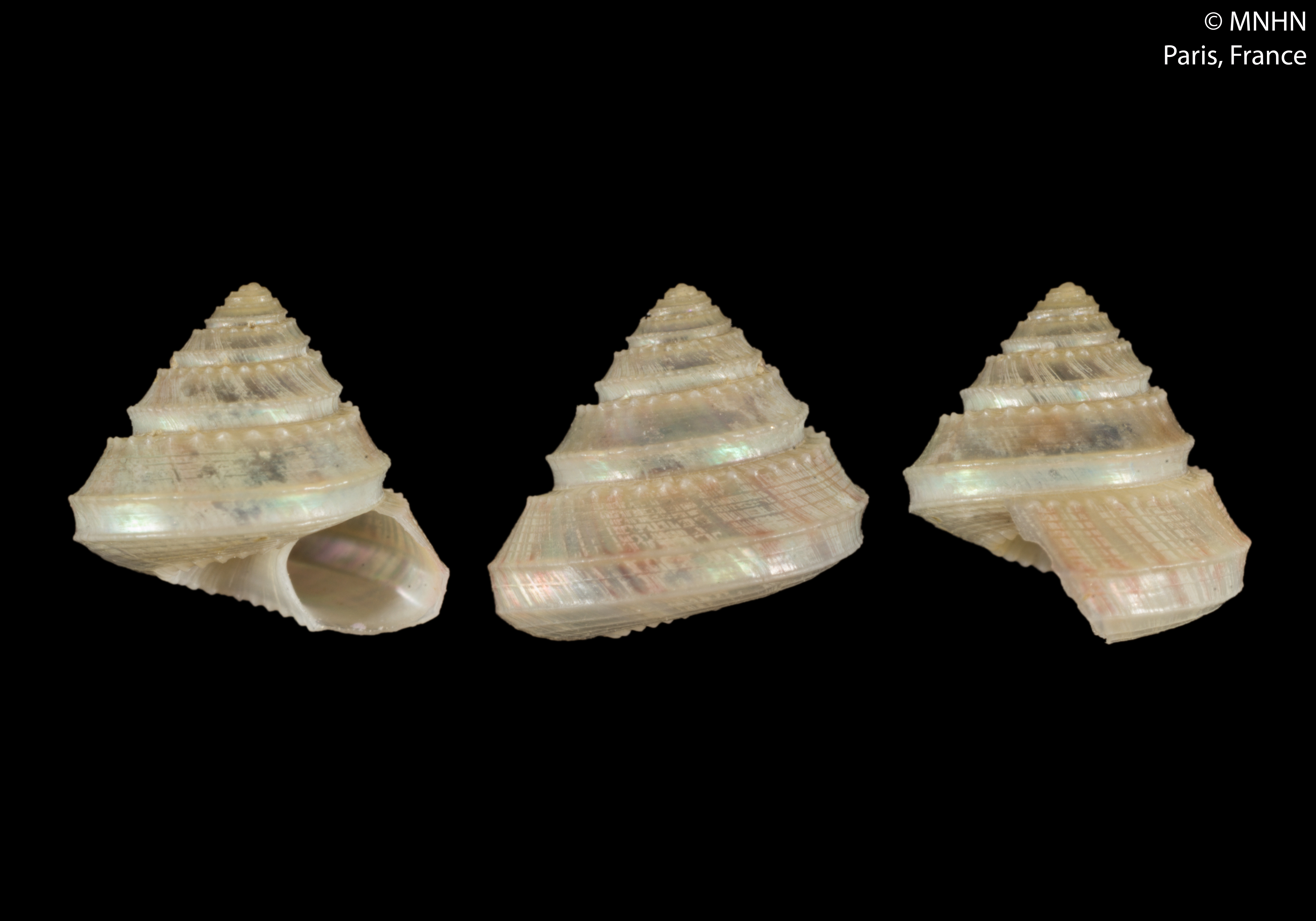
- Shell of Spectamen euteia (holotype at MNHN, Paris)

Scientific classification
- Kingdom: Animalia
- Phylum: Mollusca
- Class: Gastropoda
- Subclass: Vetigastropoda
- Order: Trochida
- Superfamily: Trochoidea
- Family: Solariellidae
- Genus: Spectamen
- Species: S. euteium

Binomial name
- Spectamen euteium (Vilvens, 2009)

Synonyms
- Solariella euteia Vilvens, 2009(original combination)

= Spectamen euteium =

Species of gastropod

Spectamen euteium is a species of sea snail, a marine gastropod mollusk in the family Solariellidae.

== Description ==
The size of the shell attains 6 mm.

== Distribution ==
This marine species occurs off Indonesia.
