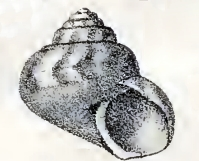

Scientific classification
- Kingdom: Animalia
- Phylum: Mollusca
- Class: Gastropoda
- Subclass: Vetigastropoda
- Order: Trochida
- Superfamily: Trochoidea
- Family: Solariellidae
- Genus: Spectamen
- Species: S. bellulum

Binomial name
- Spectamen bellulum (Angas, 1869)

Synonyms
- Minolia bellula Angas, 1869; Trochus dianthus P. Fischer, 1879

= Spectamen bellulum =

Species of gastropod

Spectamen bellulum is a species of sea snail, a marine gastropod mollusk, in the family Solariellidae.

== Distribution ==
This species occurs in Queensland.
