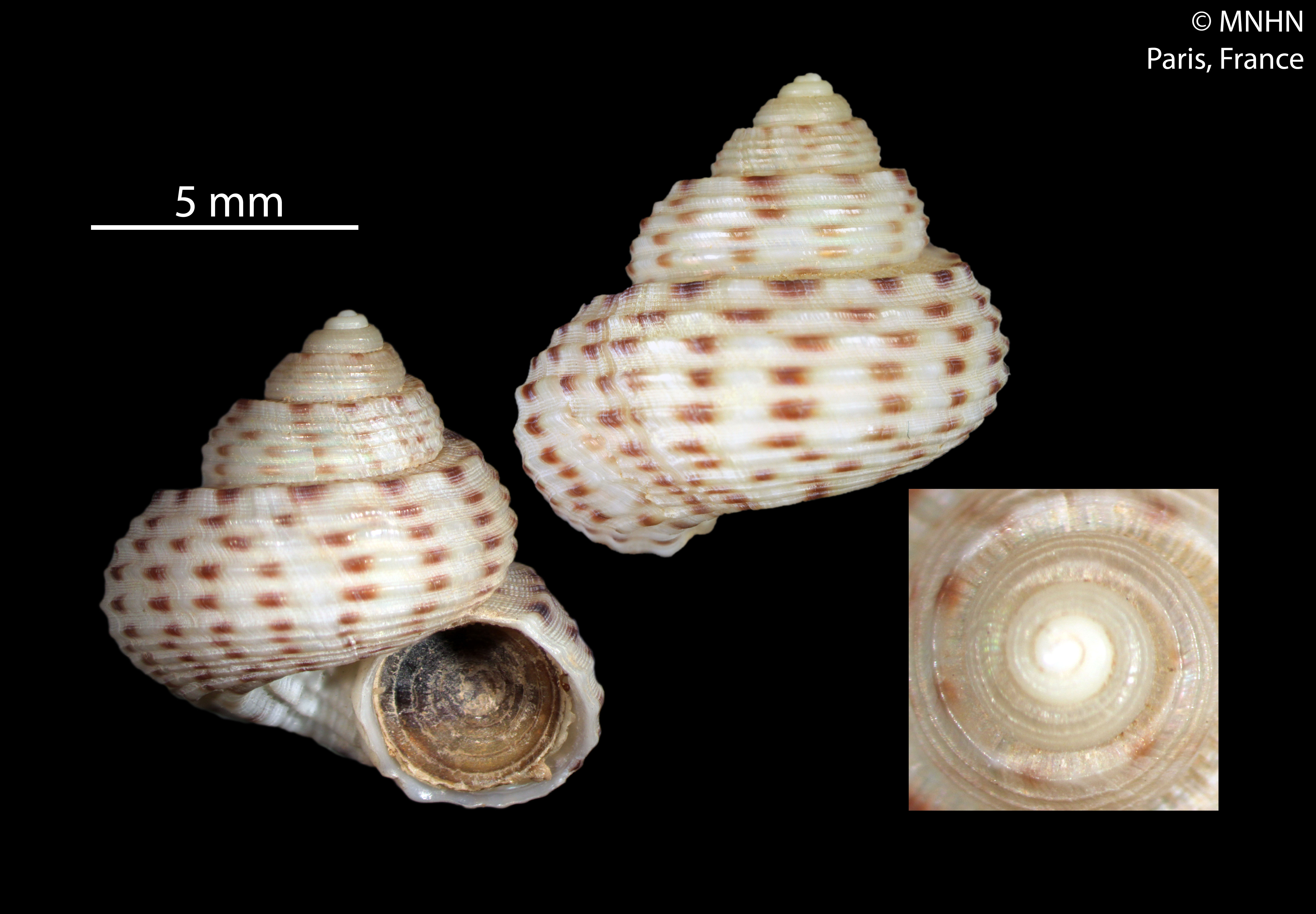
- Shell of Spectamen pardalis (paratype at MNHN, Paris)

Scientific classification
- Kingdom: Animalia
- Phylum: Mollusca
- Class: Gastropoda
- Subclass: Vetigastropoda
- Order: Trochida
- Superfamily: Trochoidea
- Family: Solariellidae
- Genus: Spectamen
- Species: S. pardalis

Binomial name
- Spectamen pardalis Herbert, 1987

Synonyms
- Minolia pardalis Herbert, 1987; Solariella (Solariella) pardalis Herbert, 1987

= Spectamen pardalis =

Species of gastropod

Spectamen pardalis is a species of sea snail, a marine gastropod mollusk in the family Solariellidae.

== Description ==
The length of the shell varies between 9 mm and 11 mm.

== Distribution ==
This marine species occurs off KwaZuluNatal to Southwest Transkei, Rep. South Africa
