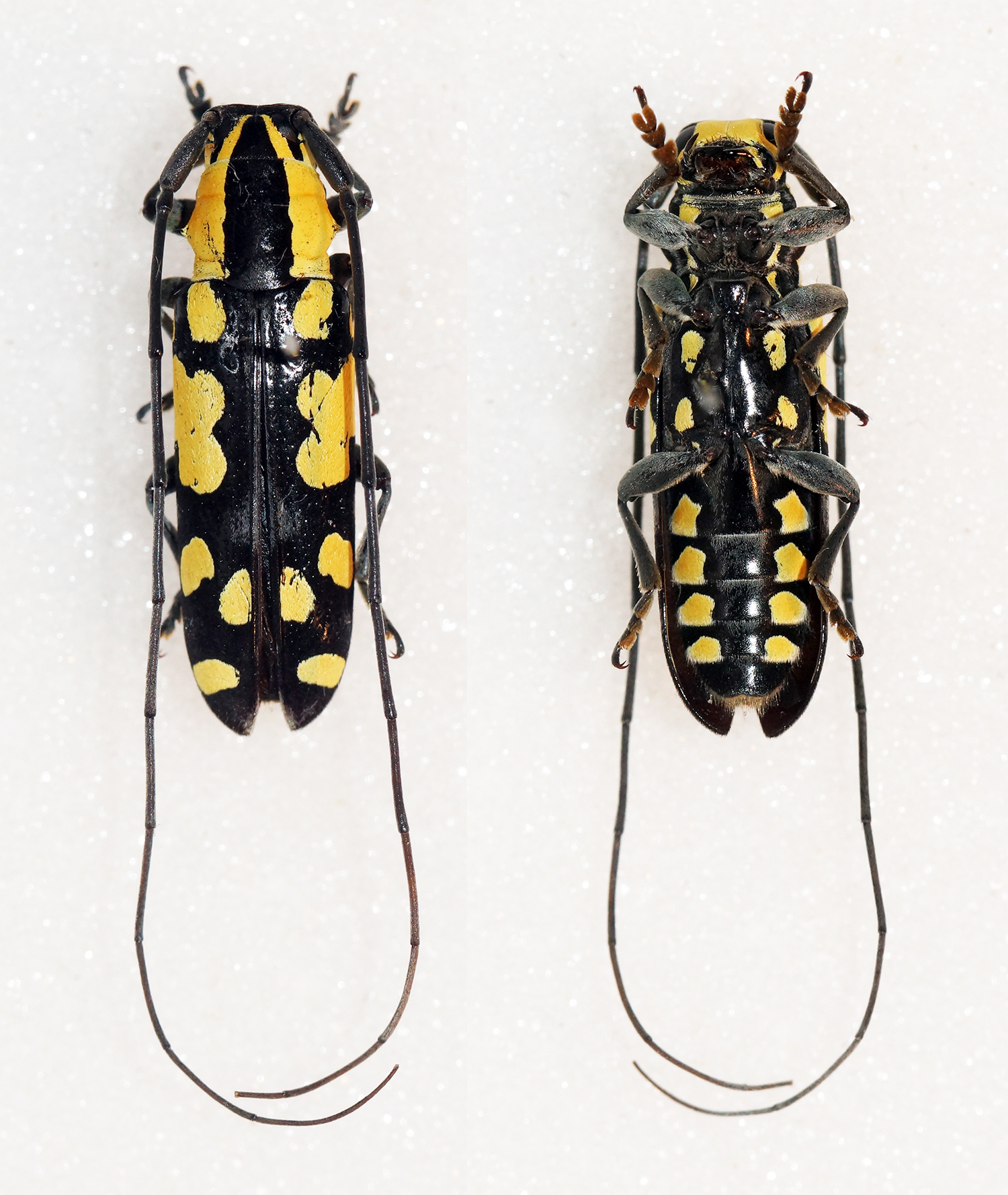
- Tragiscoschema bertolonii

Scientific classification
- Domain: Eukaryota
- Kingdom: Animalia
- Phylum: Arthropoda
- Class: Insecta
- Order: Coleoptera
- Suborder: Polyphaga
- Infraorder: Cucujiformia
- Family: Cerambycidae
- Subfamily: Lamiinae
- Tribe: Tragocephalini
- Genus: Tragiscoschema; Thomson, 1857

= Tragiscoschema =

Genus of beetles

Tragiscoschema is a genus of longhorn beetles of the subfamily Lamiinae, containing the following species:

- Tragiscoschema amabile (Perroud, 1855)
- Tragiscoschema bertolonii (Thomson, 1857)
- Tragiscoschema cor-flavum Fiedler, 1939
- Tragiscoschema elegantissimum Breuning, 1934
- Tragiscoschema holdhausi Itzinger, 1934
- Tragiscoschema inermis Aurivillius, 1908
- Tragiscoschema nigroscriptum (Fairmaire, 1897)
