= Tropidion epaphum =

Scientific classification
- Kingdom: Animalia
- Phylum: Arthropoda
- Class: Insecta
- Order: Coleoptera
- Suborder: Polyphaga
- Infraorder: Cucujiformia
- Family: Cerambycidae
- Genus: Tropidion
- Species: T. epaphum

Binomial name
- Tropidion epaphum (Berg, 1889)

Species of beetle

Tropidion epaphum is a species of beetle in the family Cerambycidae. It was described by Carlos Berg in 1889.
