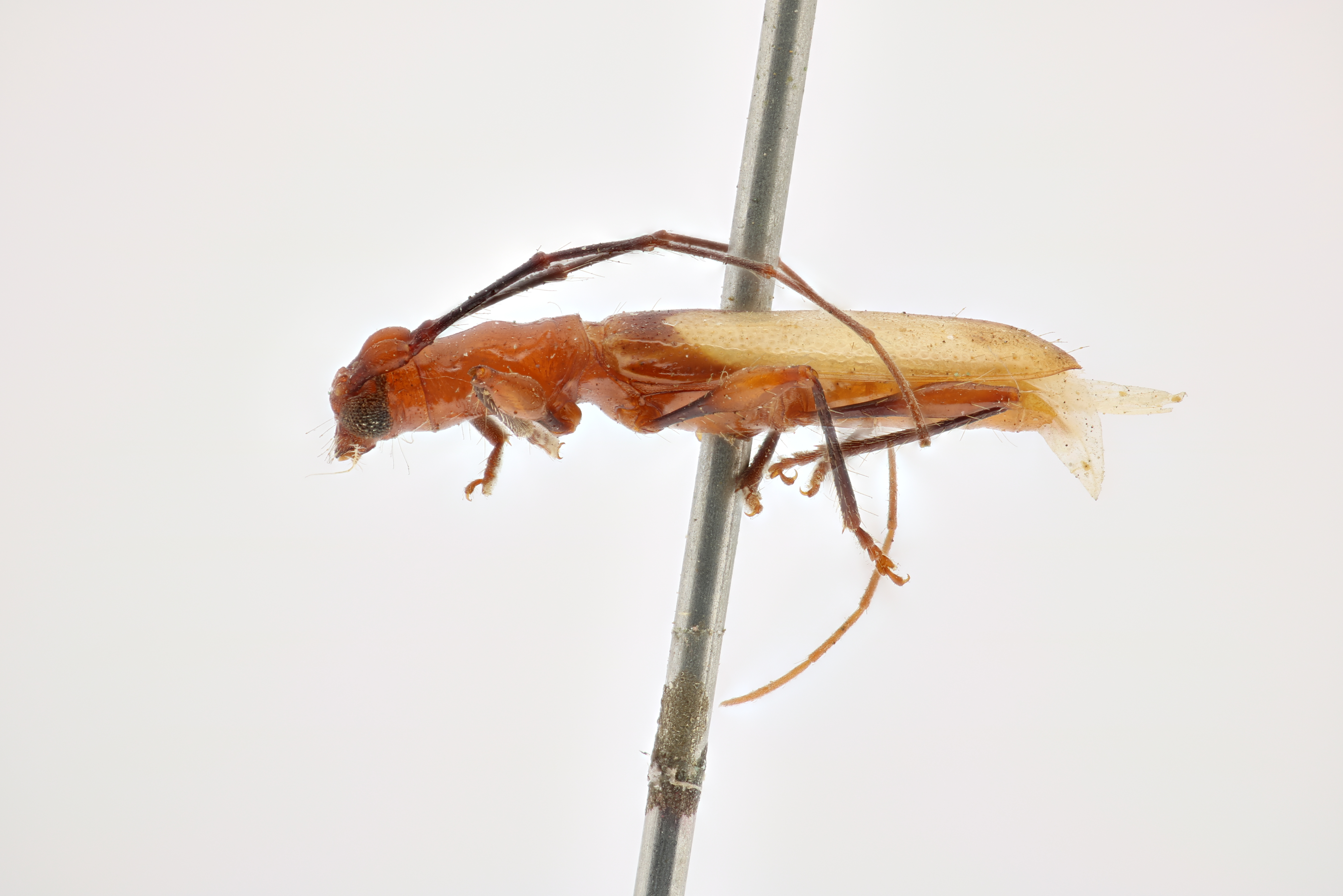
- Gnomibidion occultum

Scientific classification
- Kingdom: Animalia
- Phylum: Arthropoda
- Clade: Pancrustacea
- Class: Insecta
- Order: Coleoptera
- Suborder: Polyphaga
- Infraorder: Cucujiformia
- Family: Cerambycidae
- Subfamily: Cerambycinae
- Tribe: Ibidionini
- Genus: Gnomibidion; Martins, 1968

= Gnomibidion =

Genus of beetles

Gnomibidion is a genus of beetles in the family Cerambycidae, containing the following species:

- Gnomibidion araujoi (Martins, 1962)
- Gnomibidion armaticolle (Martins, 1965)
- Gnomibidion biacutum (Martins, 1968)
- Gnomibidion cylindricum (Thomson, 1865)
- Gnomibidion denticolle (Dalman, 1823)
- Gnomibidion digrammum (Bates, 1870)
- Gnomibidion flavum (Martins & Galileo, 2007)
- Gnomibidion fulvipes (Thomson, 1865)
- Gnomibidion occultum (Martins, 1968)
- Gnomibidion translucidum (Martins, 1960)
- Gnomibidion variabile (Martins & Galileo, 2003)
