= Tropidion bituberculatum =

Scientific classification
- Kingdom: Animalia
- Phylum: Arthropoda
- Class: Insecta
- Order: Coleoptera
- Suborder: Polyphaga
- Infraorder: Cucujiformia
- Family: Cerambycidae
- Genus: Tropidion
- Species: T. bituberculatum

Binomial name
- Tropidion bituberculatum (Audinet-Serville, 1834)

Species of beetle

Tropidion bituberculatum is a species of beetle in the family Cerambycidae. It was described by Audinet-Serville in 1834.
