= Lophopoeum saronotum =

Scientific classification
- Kingdom: Animalia
- Phylum: Arthropoda
- Class: Insecta
- Order: Coleoptera
- Suborder: Polyphaga
- Infraorder: Cucujiformia
- Family: Cerambycidae
- Genus: Lophopoeum
- Species: L. saronotum

Binomial name
- Lophopoeum saronotum Bates, 1872

Species of beetle

Lophopoeum saronotum is a species of beetle in the family Cerambycidae. It was described by Bates in 1872.
