= Flavus =

Flavus is the Latin word for yellow or blond and has given the name to many, more or less yellow, objects:

- Subrius Flavus, a failed Roman conspirator against the Emperor Nero
- Flavus, brother of Arminius

== See also ==
- Flavius
- Flava
- Flavum
- Flavin
- Flavonoids
- Flavoprotein
