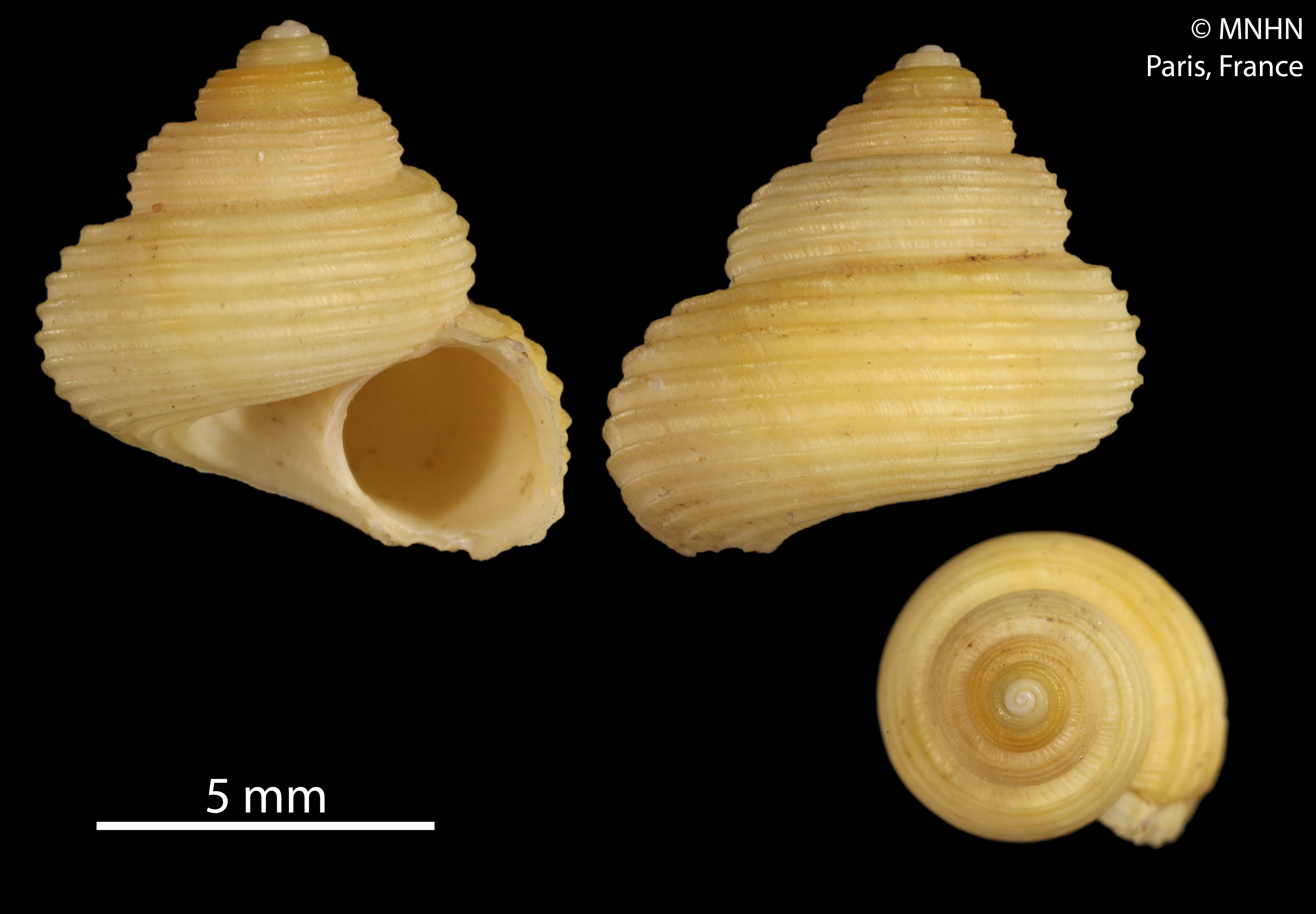
- Shell of Spectamen flavum (paratype at MNHN, Paris)

Scientific classification
- Kingdom: Animalia
- Phylum: Mollusca
- Class: Gastropoda
- Subclass: Vetigastropoda
- Order: Trochida
- Superfamily: Trochoidea
- Family: Solariellidae
- Genus: Spectamen
- Species: S. flavum

Binomial name
- Spectamen flavum Herbert, 1987

Synonyms
- Solariella (Solariella) flavum Herbert, D.G., 1987

= Spectamen flavum =

Species of gastropod

Spectamen flavum is a species of sea snail, a marine gastropod mollusk in the family Solariellidae.

== Description ==
The size of this shell attains 9 mm.

== Distribution ==
This marine species occurs off KwaZuluNatal to Southwest Transkei, Rep. South Africa.
