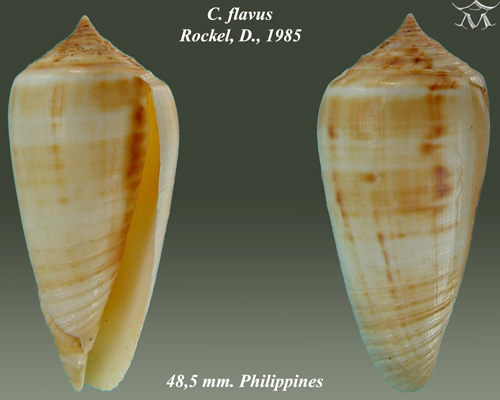
- Apertural and abapertural views of shell of Conus flavus Rockel, D., 1985
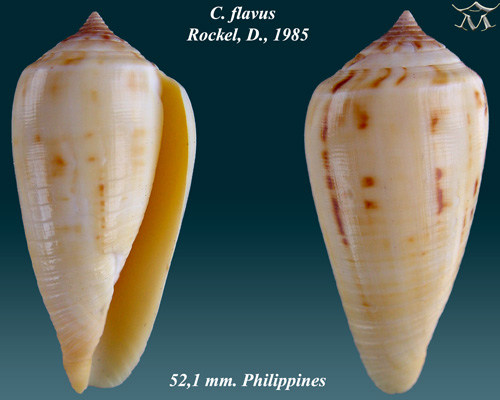

Conservation status
- Least Concern (IUCN 3.1)

Scientific classification
- Kingdom: Animalia
- Phylum: Mollusca
- Class: Gastropoda
- Subclass: Caenogastropoda
- Order: Neogastropoda
- Superfamily: Conoidea
- Family: Conidae
- Genus: Conus
- Species: C. flavus

Binomial name
- Conus flavus Röckel, 1985

Synonyms
- Asprella flava (Röckel, 1985); Conus (Phasmoconus) flavus Röckel, 1985· accepted, alternate representation; Graphiconus flavus (Röckel, 1985)

= Conus flavus =

Species of sea snail

Conus flavus is a species of sea snail, a marine gastropod mollusk in the family Conidae, the cone snails and their allies.

Like all species within the genus Conus, these snails are predatory and venomous. They are capable of stinging humans, therefore live ones should be handled carefully or not at all.

== Description ==
The size of the shell varies between 45 mm and 78 mm.

== Distribution ==
This marine species occurs off the Philippines, New Guinea; the Solomon Islands and Fiji.
