= Lophopoeum w-flavum =

Scientific classification
- Kingdom: Animalia
- Phylum: Arthropoda
- Class: Insecta
- Order: Coleoptera
- Suborder: Polyphaga
- Infraorder: Cucujiformia
- Family: Cerambycidae
- Genus: Lophopoeum
- Species: L. w-flavum

Binomial name
- Lophopoeum w-flavum Bates, 1885

Species of beetle

Lophopoeum w-flavum is a species of beetle in the family Cerambycidae. It was described by Henry Walter Bates in 1885.
