= Tragiscoschema cor-flavum =

Scientific classification
- Domain: Eukaryota
- Kingdom: Animalia
- Phylum: Arthropoda
- Class: Insecta
- Order: Coleoptera
- Suborder: Polyphaga
- Infraorder: Cucujiformia
- Family: Cerambycidae
- Genus: Tragiscoschema
- Species: T. cor-flavum

Binomial name
- Tragiscoschema cor-flavum Fiedler, 1939

Species of beetle

Tragiscoschema cor-flavum is a species of beetle in the family Cerambycidae. It was described by Fiedler in 1939.
