= Punctulum flavum =

Scientific classification
- Kingdom: Animalia
- Phylum: Mollusca
- Class: Gastropoda
- Subclass: Caenogastropoda
- Order: Littorinimorpha
- Family: Rissoidae
- Genus: Punctulum
- Species: P. flavum

Binomial name
- Punctulum flavum (Okutani, 1964)

Synonyms
- Microstelma flava Okutani, 1964 (basionym); Punctulum ochotense Golikov & Sirenko, 1998

Species of gastropod

Punctulum flavum is a species of small sea snail, a marine gastropod mollusk or micromollusk in the family Rissoidae.
