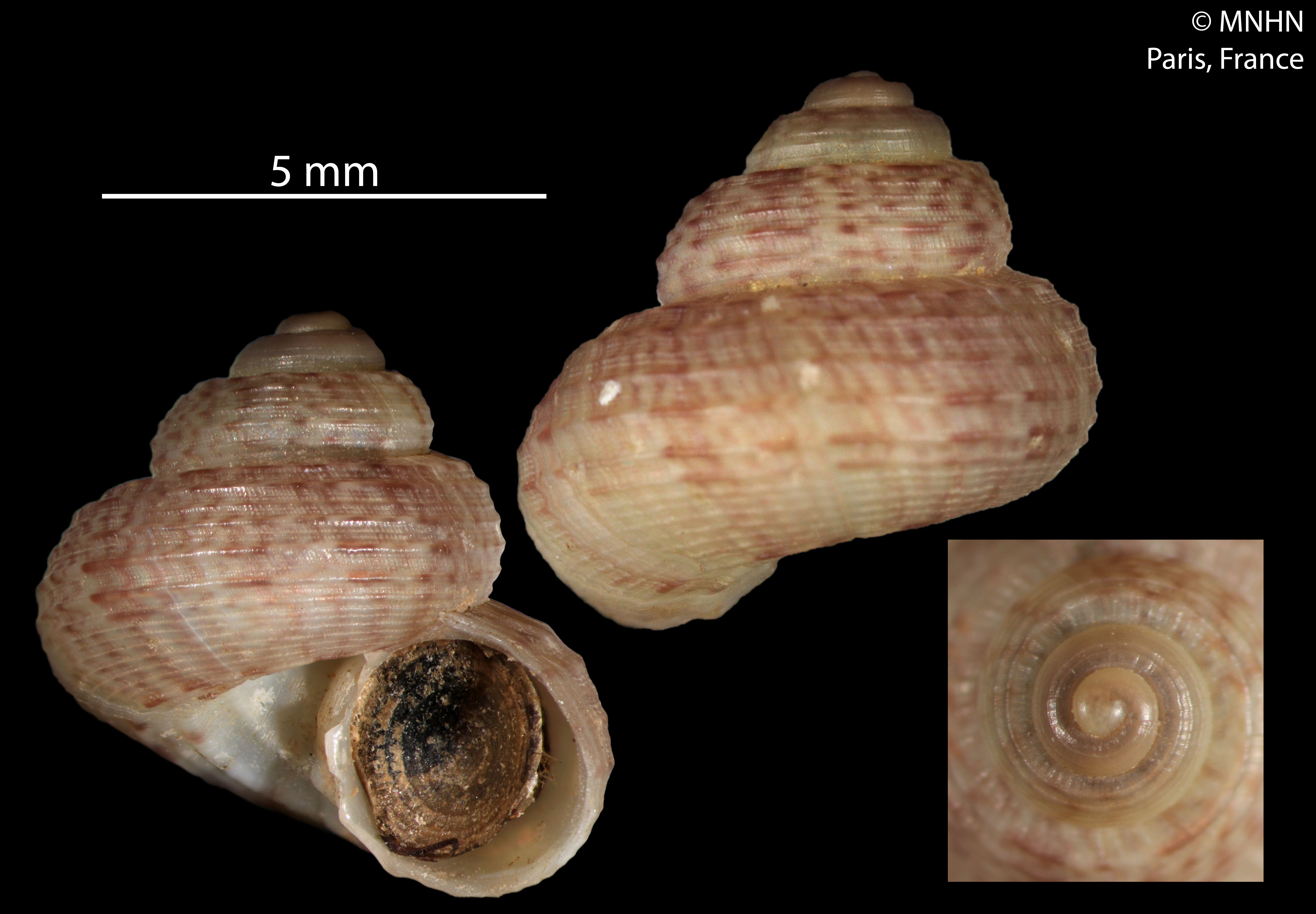
- Shell of Spectamen gerula (paratype at MNHN, Paris)

Scientific classification
- Kingdom: Animalia
- Phylum: Mollusca
- Class: Gastropoda
- Subclass: Vetigastropoda
- Order: Trochida
- Superfamily: Trochoidea
- Family: Solariellidae
- Genus: Spectamen
- Species: S. gerula

Binomial name
- Spectamen gerula Herbert, 1987

Synonyms
- Solariella (Solariella) gerula Herbert, 1987

= Spectamen gerula =

Species of gastropod

Spectamen gerula is a species of sea snail, a marine gastropod mollusk in the family Solariellidae.

== Description ==
The size of the shell attains 8 mm.

== Distribution ==
This marine species occurs off KwaZuluNatal to the Eastern Cape Province, Rep. South Africa.
