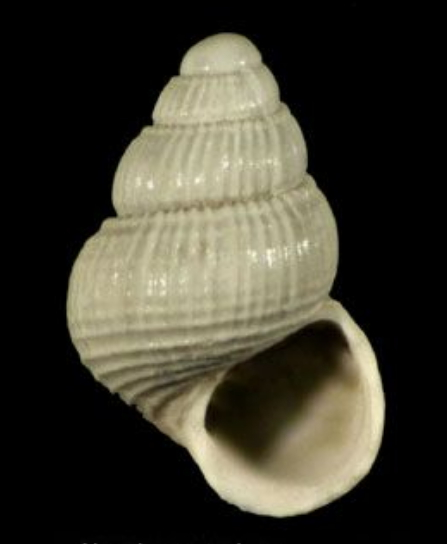
- Shell of Alvania porcupinae (specimen at the Natural History Museum, Rotterdam)

Scientific classification
- Kingdom: Animalia
- Phylum: Mollusca
- Class: Gastropoda
- Subclass: Caenogastropoda
- Order: Littorinimorpha
- Superfamily: Rissooidea
- Family: Rissoidae
- Genus: Alvania
- Species: A. porcupinae

Binomial name
- Alvania porcupinae Gofas & Warén, 1982

Synonyms
- Punctulum porcupinae (Gofas & Warén, 1982); Rissoa deliciosa var. multicostata Jeffreys, 1884

= Alvania porcupinae =

Species of gastropod

Alvania porcupinae is a species of minute sea snail, a marine gastropod mollusc or micromollusk in the family Rissoidae.

== Description ==
Snail of this class usually has a large external shell where the body can fully retracted inside .The length of the shell varies between 1.8mm and 2mm. Most of the shelled gastropods have a one piece shell typically coiled or spiraled. This is usually made of a horn - like material, but in some molluscs it is calcareous.

== Distribution ==
This species occurs in the Atlantic Ocean from the Bay of Biscay to West Africa.
