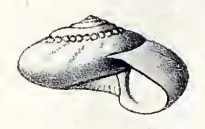
- Drawing of a shell of Microgaza rotella

Scientific classification
- Kingdom: Animalia
- Phylum: Mollusca
- Class: Gastropoda
- Subclass: Vetigastropoda
- Order: Trochida
- Family: Solariellidae
- Genus: Microgaza; Dall, 1881

Type species
- Solariella (Microgaza) rotella Dall,1881

Species
- See text

Synonyms
- Callogaza (Microgaza) Dall, 1881 (original rank); Microgaza (Microgaza) Dall, 1881; Solariella (Microgaza) Dall, 1881

= Microgaza =

Genus of gastropods

Microgaza is a genus of sea snails, marine gastropod mollusks in the family Solariellidae.

== Description ==
The flattened shell is rotelliform, resembling a species from the genus Gaza without the reflected lip or umbilical callus. The shell is brilliantly nacreous when fresh. It has a distinctly scalariform umbilicus.

== Species ==
Species within the genus Microgaza include:

- † Microgaza bailyi (Gabb, 1861)
- Microgaza rotella Dall, 1881
- Microgaza vetula Woodring, 1928

Species brought into synonymy

- Microgaza alabida (Marshall, 1979) accepted as Archiminolia alabida (B. A. Marshall, 1979)
- Microgaza corona Lee Y.C. & Wu W.L., 2001: synonym of Elaphriella corona (Y.-C. Lee & W.-L. Wu, 2001) (original combination)
- Microgaza dawsoni (Marshall, 1979) accepted as Archiminolia dawsoni (B. A. Marshall, 1979)
- Microgaza fulgens Dall, 1907: synonym of Ilanga fulgens (Dall, 1907)
- Microgaza gotoi Poppe, Tagaro & Dekker, 2006: synonym of Ilanga gotoi (Poppe, Tagaro & Dekker, 2006)
- Microgaza hurleyi (Marshall, 1979) accepted as Archiminolia hurleyi (B. A. Marshall, 1979)
- Microgaza inornata Quinn, 1979: synonym of Microgaza rotella inornata Quinn, 1979
- Microgaza iridescens (Habe, 1968): synonym of Archiminolia iridescens (Habe, 1961)
- Microgaza katoi (Kuroda & Habe, 1961): synonym of Archiminolia katoi (Kuroda & Habe, 1961)
- Microgaza konos Vilvens, 2009: synonym of Ilanga konos (Vilvens, 2009) (original combination)
- Microgaza navakaensis Ladd, 1982: synonym of Ilanga navakaensis (Ladd, 1982) (original combination)
- Microgaza norfolkensis Marshall, 1999; synonym of Ilanga norfolkensis (B. A. Marshall, 1999)
- Microgaza opalina (Shikama & Hayashi, 1977): synonym of Elaphriella opalina (Shikama & Hayashi, 1977) (original combination)
- Microgaza ziczac Kuroda & Habe, 1971: synonym of Archiminolia ziczac (Kuroda & Habe, 1971)
