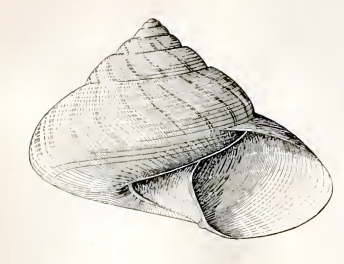
- Apertural view of a shell of Archiminolia oleacea

Scientific classification
- Kingdom: Animalia
- Phylum: Mollusca
- Class: Gastropoda
- Subclass: Vetigastropoda
- Order: Trochida
- Family: Solariellidae
- Genus: Archiminolia; Iredale, 1929

Type species
- Monilea oleacea Hedley & Petterd, 1906

Species
- See text

= Archiminolia =

Genus of gastropods

Archiminolia is a genus of sea snails, marine gastropod mollusks in the family Solariellidae, the top snails.

B.A. Marshall (1979) considered Ethaliopsis Schepman and Archiminolia Iredale synonym with Microgaza Dall.

== Description ==
The spire is moderately elevated. The teleoconch contains fine spiral cords. The subsutural cord sometimes contains nodules. The open, but not very broad umbilicus has no callus. The radula contains a broad latero-marginal plate.

== Species ==
Species within the genus Archiminolia include:

- Archiminolia diplax Marshall, 1999
- Archiminolia episcopalis Marshall, 1999
- Archiminolia hurleyi (B. A. Marshall, 1979)
- Archiminolia iridescens (Habe, 1961)
- Archiminolia katoi (Kuroda & Habe in Habe, 1961)
- Archiminolia meridiana (Dell, 1953)
- Archiminolia oleata (Hedley & Petterd, 1906)
- Archiminolia olivaceostrigata (Schepman, 1908)
- Archiminolia ostreion Vilvens, 2009
- Archiminolia regalis Marshall, 1999
- Archiminolia strobilos Vilvens, 2009
- Archiminolia wanganellica Marshall, 1999
- Archiminolia ziczac (Kuroda & Habe, 1971)

Species brought into synonymy

- Archiminolia alabida (B. A. Marshall, 1979): synonym of Bathymophila alabida (B. A. Marshall, 1979)
- Archiminolia dawsoni (B. A. Marshall, 1979): synonym of Bathymophila dawsoni (B. A. Marshall, 1979) (superseded combination)
- Archiminolia diadema Marshall, 1999: synonym of Bathymophila diadema (B. A. Marshall, 1999)
- Archiminolia fulgens (Dall, 1907): synonym of Ilanga fulgens (Dall, 1907) (superseded combination)
- Archiminolia ptykte Vilvens, 2009: synonym of Ilanga ptykte (Vilvens, 2009) (original combination)
- Archiminolia tenuiseptum Marshall, 1999: synonym of Phragmomphalina tenuiseptum (B. A. Marshall, 1999) (original combination)
- * Archiminolia zacalles (Melvill & Standen, 1903): synonym of Solariella zacalles Melvill, 1903
- Archiminolia zacaloides (Schepman, 1908): synonym of Ilanga zacalloides (Schepman, 1908) (superseded combination and misspelling of species name)
