= Ilangai (disambiguation) =

Ilangai is the Tamil name (இலங்கை; written in Tamil script) for the island of Sri Lanka.

Ilangai may also refer to:

- Ilanga impolita, a species of gastropod
- Ilanga illustris, a species of gastropod
- Ilanga, a genus of gastropods
- Ilanga incisura, a species of gastropod
- Ilankai Tamil Arasu Kachchi, a nationalist party from the Tamil part of Sri Lanka
