= Gravida (disambiguation) =

- Gravida (organization) (Gravida: National Centre for Growth and Development) is a New Zealand government-funded Centre of Research Excellence
- La donna gravida, an oil portrait by Raphael
- Lasiothyris gravida, a species of moth
- Pareuxoa gravida, a species of moth
- Bathymophila gravida, a species of sea snail
- Cribrarula gravida, a species of sea snail
- Odostomia gravida, a species of sea snail

== See also ==
- Gravidity and parity
