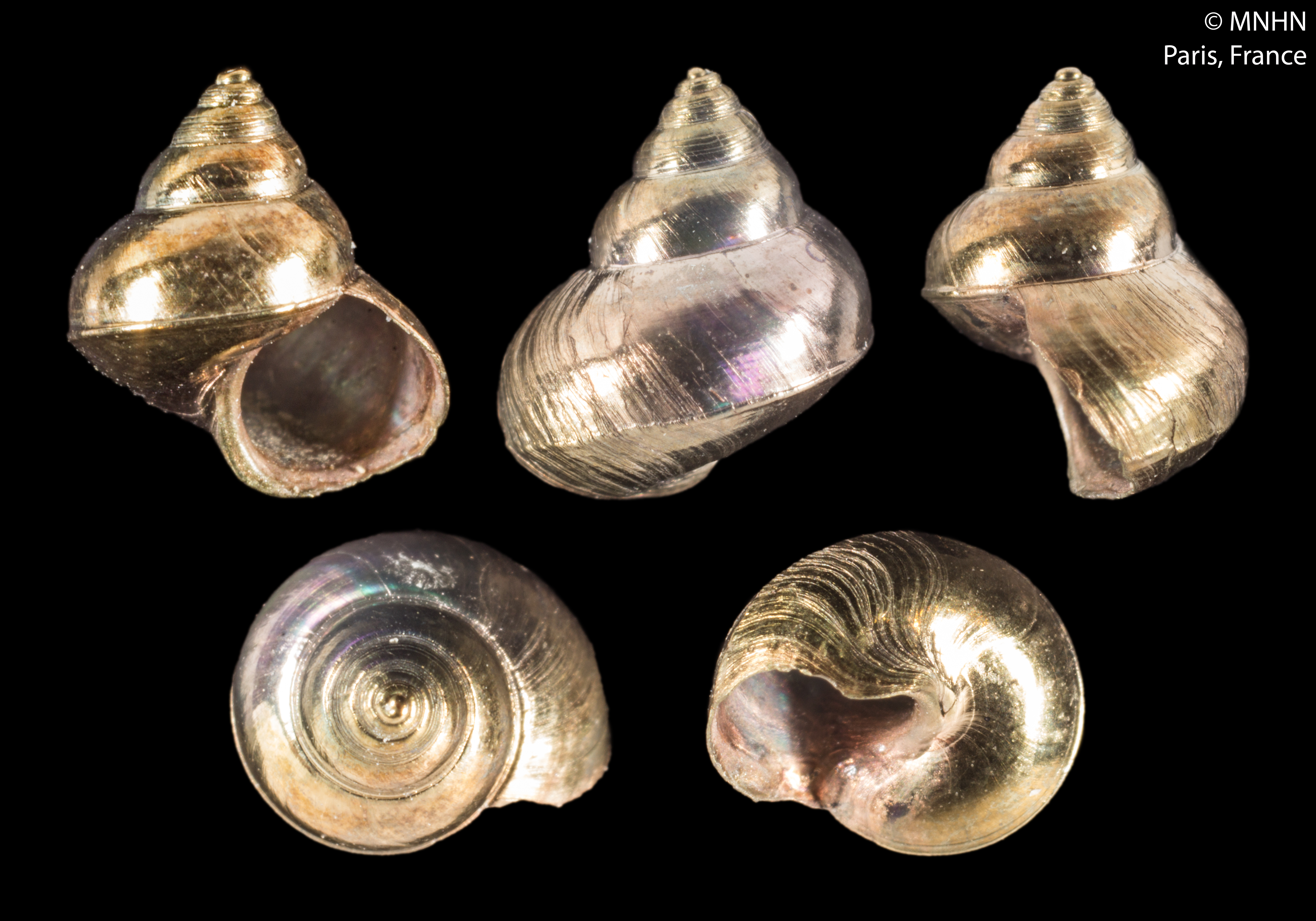
- Shell of Kaiparathina boucheti

Scientific classification
- Kingdom: Animalia
- Phylum: Mollusca
- Class: Gastropoda
- Subclass: Vetigastropoda
- Order: Trochida
- Superfamily: Trochoidea
- Family: Trochidae
- Genus: Kaiparathina; Laws, 1941

Type species
- † Kaiparathina praecellens Laws, 1941

= Kaiparathina =

Genus of gastropods

Kaiparathina is a genus of sea snails, marine gastropod mollusks in the subfamily Kaiparathininae of the family Trochidae.

== Species ==
Species within the genus Kaiparathina include:

- Kaiparathina boucheti Marshall, 1993
- Kaiparathina coriolis Marshall, 1993
- Kaiparathina daedala Marshall, 1993
- Kaiparathina fasciata Marshall, 1993
- † Kaiparathina praecellens Laws, 1941
- † Kaiparathina senex B. A. Marshall, 1995
- Kaiparathina vaubani Marshall, 1993

Species brought into synonymy

- † Kaiparathina navakaensis (Ladd, 1982): synonym of Ilanga navakaensis (Ladd, 1982)
