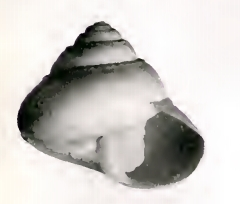
- Bathymophila micans shell

Scientific classification
- Kingdom: Animalia
- Phylum: Mollusca
- Class: Gastropoda
- Subclass: Vetigastropoda
- Order: Trochida
- Family: Solariellidae
- Genus: Bathymophila; Dall, 1881

Type species
- Margarites euspira Dall, 1881

Species
- See text

Synonyms
- Ethaliopsis Schepman, 1908; Margarita (Bathymophila) Dall, 1881 (original rank); Solariella (Ethaliopsis) Schepman, 1908

= Bathymophila =

Genus of gastropods

Bathymophila is a genus of sea snails, marine gastropod mollusks in the family Solariellidae.

Previously Bathymophila was brought under the subfamily Margaritinae, because of the resemblance of its shell with Margarites Gray, 1847

== Description ==
The shell has a broad flattened columella, which has a blunt tooth, rough or granulated, at its end.

== Species ==
Species within the genus Bathymophila include:

- Bathymophila aages Vilvens, 2009
- Bathymophila alabida (B. A. Marshall, 1979)
- Bathymophila asphala Marshall, 1999
- Bathymophila bairdii (Dall, 1889)
- Bathymophila callomphala (Schepman, 1908)
- Bathymophila dawsoni (B. A. Marshall, 1979)
- Bathymophila diadema (B. A. Marshall, 1999)
- Bathymophila euspira (Dall, 1881)
- Bathymophila gravida Marshall, 1999
- Bathymophila micans (Dautzenberg & Fischer, 1896)
- Bathymophila valentia Marshall, 1999

Species brought into synonymy

- Bathymophila nitens (Dall, 1881): synonym of Bathymophila euspira (Dall, 1881)
- Bathymophila tenorioi Poppe, Tagaro & Dekker, 2006: synonym of Arxellia tenorioi (Poppe, Tagaro & Dekker, 2006) (original combination)
