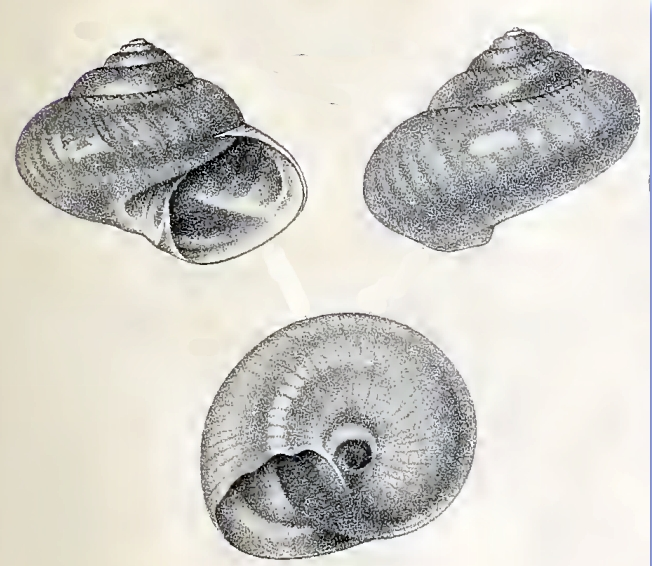
- Original drawing with three views of a shell of Archiminolia olivaceostrigata

Scientific classification
- Kingdom: Animalia
- Phylum: Mollusca
- Class: Gastropoda
- Subclass: Vetigastropoda
- Order: Trochida
- Superfamily: Trochoidea
- Family: Solariellidae
- Genus: Archiminolia
- Species: A. olivaceostrigata

Binomial name
- Archiminolia olivaceostrigata (Schepman, 1908)

Synonyms
- Solariella olivaceostrigata Schepman, 1908

= Archiminolia olivaceostrigata =

Species of gastropod

Archiminolia olivaceostrigata is a species of sea snail, a marine gastropod mollusk in the family Solariellidae.

== Description ==
(Original description by M. Schepman) The height of the shell attains 9.5 mm, its diameter 11.5 mm. The rather thin shell has a depressed-conoidal shape. Its upper whorls are nacreous, with a very beautiful purple and green tinge, the last whorls whitish, adorned on the upper surface by rather broad, olivaceous streaks. The shell contains six whorls. The nucleus is smooth, followed by a 2nd and 3rd whorl, each with 6 spiral lirae of which the upper ones are slightly undulate. On the fourth whorl the lirae disappear, only the 'upper one remains and becomes beaded. It borders the broadly canaliculated suture, which in this and in the fifth whorl, is crossed by conspicuous striae, which run partly also on the convex, smooth, lower part of these whorls. Near the body whorl the beads disappear, the suture becomes less broad and deep. This body whorl is nearly smooth, except for most tender spiral and radiating striae, only visible under magnification, and a few remote deeper striae near the suture, being the continuation of the beads. It is strongly depressed, more convex above than below, with a blunt angle, but no keel. The umbilicus is funnel-shaped, moderately wide and pervious. Its walls are smooth, with only a few growth striae. It is bordered by a spiral ridge, which is indistinctly beaded. The aperture is rounded-triangular. The upper and basal margins are regularly rounded, the upper one being more curved. The columellar margin is nearly straight, slightly expanded at its upper end above the umbilicus, thickened below and forming a distinct angle with the basal margin, largely due to the ending of the umbilical ridge. Interior of aperture strongly iridescent. The thin operculum is corneous, with many whorls (about 10). The outer surface is hollow, with irregular, radiating striae, which are more numerous and regular near the sutural line. The inner surface is convex, and very smooth.

The radula has about 26 rows of teeth and 7 median rows, with a large number of uncini. The rhachidian tooth has a subquadrate body with winged sides and a long triangular cusp with convex sides, which are serrated. The body of the first lateral is nearly quadrate, with a broad triangular cusp, serrated on the distal and part of the proximal margin. The second lateral is oblong and serrated like the first one. The third lateral has a quadrangular body, with a simple cusp. The fourth lateral is very large, its body irregular, its cusp long, serrated on both sides, but this is only visible on the upper side in its normal position. The uncini, the number of which I cannot ascertain, are long, slender, and apparently smooth, though in some of them, a few very small denticles are present, but they are only visible in an expanded position. The bodies of the median teeth are brown especially towards the centre.

== Distribution ==
This marine species occurs in the Celebes Sea.
