= Bathymophila bairdii =

Scientific classification
- Kingdom: Animalia
- Phylum: Mollusca
- Class: Gastropoda
- Subclass: Vetigastropoda
- Order: Trochida
- Superfamily: Trochoidea
- Family: Solariellidae
- Genus: Bathymophila
- Species: B. bairdii

Binomial name
- Bathymophila bairdii (Dall, 1889)

Synonyms
- Margarites bairdii (Dall, 1889); Umbonium bairdii Dall, 1889

Species of gastropod

Bathymophila bairdii is a species of sea snail, a marine gastropod mollusk, in the family Solariellidae.
