= Archiminolia episcopalis =

Scientific classification
- Kingdom: Animalia
- Phylum: Mollusca
- Class: Gastropoda
- Subclass: Vetigastropoda
- Order: Trochida
- Superfamily: Trochoidea
- Family: Solariellidae
- Genus: Archiminolia
- Species: A. episcopalis

Binomial name
- Archiminolia episcopalis Marshall, 1999

Species of gastropod

Archiminolia episcopalis is a species of sea snail, a marine gastropod mollusk in the family Solariellidae.

== Description ==
The diameter of the shell attains 10.6 mm.

== Distribution ==
This marine species is endemic to New Zealand and occurs off Three Kings Islands at a depth of 427 m.
