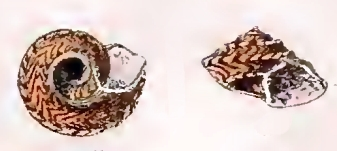
- Original drawing with two views of a shell of Ilanga bicarinata

Scientific classification
- Kingdom: Animalia
- Phylum: Mollusca
- Class: Gastropoda
- Subclass: Vetigastropoda
- Order: Trochida
- Superfamily: Trochoidea
- Family: Solariellidae
- Genus: Ilanga
- Species: I. bicarinata

Binomial name
- Ilanga bicarinata (A. Adams & Reeve, 1850)

Synonyms
- Margarita bicarinata A. Adams & Reeve, 1850 (original combination); Minolia bicarinata (A. Adams & Reeve, 1850)

= Ilanga bicarinata =

Species of gastropod

Ilanga bicarinata is a species of sea snail, a marine gastropod mollusk in the family Solariellidae.

== Description ==
The shell has a depressed orbicular shape with a broad umbilicus. Its color is white, closely painted longitudinally with wide brown stripes. The shell contains 5½ smooth whorls. The apex is acute. The whorls are bicarinated. The carinae are distant. The interspaces are concave, spirally closely lineated, concentrically striated. The color of the shell is brownish or yellowish, variegated with reddish flammules. The carinae are obliquely articulated with red. The interior is iridescent.

This shell is characterized externally by a certain metallic hue, whilst it is particularly iridescent in the interior.

== Distribution ==
This marine species occurs in "Eastern Seas" (not further specified).

== Subdivisions ==
- Ilanga bicarinata bicarinata (A. Adams & Reeve, 1850)
- Ilanga bicarinata sphinx Herbert, 1987
