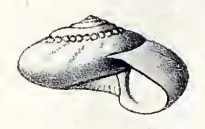
- Drawing of a shell of Microgaza rotella

Scientific classification
- Kingdom: Animalia
- Phylum: Mollusca
- Class: Gastropoda
- Subclass: Vetigastropoda
- Order: Trochida
- Superfamily: Trochoidea
- Family: Solariellidae
- Genus: Microgaza
- Species: M. rotella

Binomial name
- Microgaza rotella Dall, 1881

Synonyms
- Callogaza rotella Dall, 1881; Eumargarita rotella (Dall, 1881)

= Microgaza rotella =

Species of gastropod

Microgaza rotella is a species of sea snail, a marine gastropod mollusk in the family Solariellidae.

Subspecies

- Microgaza rotella inornata Quinn, 1979 (synonym: Microgaza inornata Quinn, 1979)
- Microgaza rotella rotella (Dall, 1881)

== Description ==
The depressed shell is small and grows to a length of 6.8 mm. It has five whorls, somewhat flattened above and below. The nucleus is small, translucent white, and with the two first whorls polished. The nucleus is smooth or marked only by faint growth lines. The remainder of the whorls show a narrow puckered band revolving immediately below the suture, on which the shell matter is as it were pinched up into slight elevations at regular intervals, about half a millimeter apart. Outside of this band, an impressed line revolves around the shell in some specimens. The remainder is smooth, shining or with evanescent traces of revolving lines impressed from within and strongest about the rounded periphery. The base of the shell is rounded toward the umbilical carina over which it seems to be drawn into flexuously radiating well-marked plications (about thirty-two on the last turn). These plications disappear a third of the way toward the periphery. The wall of the umbilicus is concave, overhung by the carina. The turns of the shell are so coiled that the part of each whorl uncovered by its successor forms a narrow spiral plane ascending to the apex like a spiral staircase or screw thread. The thin columella is straight and lacks a callus. The aperture is rounded except at the angle of the umbilical carina. The margin is thin, sharp, not reflected or thickened. There is no callus on the body whorl in the aperture.

The shell is whitish or greenish. The nacre is less brilliant in dead or deep-water specimens. The shell shows zigzag brown lines variously transversely disposed and disappearing on the base.

== Distribution ==
This species occurs in the following locations:

- Aruba
- Bonaire
- Caribbean Sea
- Cuba
- Curaçao
- Gulf of Mexico
- Puerto Rico
- Atlantic Ocean off North Carolina.
