= Kaiparathina praecellens =

Scientific classification
- Kingdom: Animalia
- Phylum: Mollusca
- Class: Gastropoda
- Subclass: Vetigastropoda
- Order: Trochida
- Family: Trochidae
- Genus: Kaiparathina
- Species: K. praecellens

Binomial name
- Kaiparathina praecellens Laws, 1941

Species of gastropod

Kaiparathina praecellens is a species of sea snail, a marine gastropod mollusk in the family Trochidae. It is only known as a fossil.
