= Bathymophila valentia =

Scientific classification
- Kingdom: Animalia
- Phylum: Mollusca
- Class: Gastropoda
- Subclass: Vetigastropoda
- Order: Trochida
- Superfamily: Trochoidea
- Family: Solariellidae
- Genus: Bathymophila
- Species: B. valentia

Binomial name
- Bathymophila valentia (Marshall, 1999)

Species of gastropod

Bathymophila valentia is a species of sea snail, a marine gastropod mollusk in the family Solariellidae.

== Description ==
The diameter of the shell attains 8.6 mm.

== Distribution ==
This marine species is endemic to New Zealand and occurs off the Three Kings Rise at depths between 1,210 m and 1,570 m.
