= Bathymophila asphala =

Scientific classification
- Kingdom: Animalia
- Phylum: Mollusca
- Class: Gastropoda
- Subclass: Vetigastropoda
- Order: Trochida
- Superfamily: Trochoidea
- Family: Solariellidae
- Genus: Bathymophila
- Species: B. asphala

Binomial name
- Bathymophila asphala Marshall, 1999

Species of gastropod

Bathymophila asphala is a species of sea snail, a marine gastropod mollusk in the family Solariellidae.

== Description ==
The diameter of the shell attains 8.2 mm.

== Distribution ==
This marine species is endemic to New Zealand and occurs off Norfolk Island and the Three Kings Islands at depths between 326 m and 757 m.
