= Ilanga kilburni =

Scientific classification
- Kingdom: Animalia
- Phylum: Mollusca
- Class: Gastropoda
- Subclass: Vetigastropoda
- Order: Trochida
- Superfamily: Trochoidea
- Family: Solariellidae
- Genus: Ilanga
- Species: I. kilburni

Binomial name
- Ilanga kilburni Herbert, 1987

Species of gastropod

Ilanga kilburni is a species of sea snail, a marine gastropod mollusk in the family Solariellidae.

== Description ==
The diameter of the shell attains 14 mm.

== Distribution ==
This marine species occurs off Transkei to the Eastern Cape Province, South Africa.
