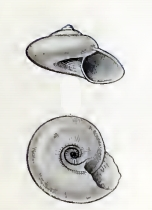
- Original drawing with two views of a shell of Ilanga aquamarina

Scientific classification
- Kingdom: Animalia
- Phylum: Mollusca
- Class: Gastropoda
- Subclass: Vetigastropoda
- Order: Trochida
- Superfamily: Trochoidea
- Family: Solariellidae
- Genus: Ilanga
- Species: I. aquamarina

Binomial name
- Ilanga aquamarina (Melvill, 1909)

Synonyms
- Solariella aquamarina Melvill, 1909

= Ilanga aquamarina =

Species of gastropod

Ilanga aquamarina is a species of sea snail, a marine gastropod mollusk in the family Solariellidae.

== Description ==
The shell has a depressed conical shape and is deeply umbilicate. It contains six whorls. The three apical whorls are small and thin. The aperture is round. The horny operculum has 6-7 spirals. The shell has a slightly fugitive colour of pearly aquamarine or beryl. It is remarkably smooth, the only sculpture being the incised radiate sulculi around the umbilicus, and the fine spiral liration of the apical whorls. The simple peristome is remarkably thin and not in the least reflected. This species has all the appearance of an abysmal shell.

== Distribution ==
This marine species occurs off Saya de Malha Bank, West Indian Ocean
