= Ilanga lirellata =

Scientific classification
- Kingdom: Animalia
- Phylum: Mollusca
- Class: Gastropoda
- Subclass: Vetigastropoda
- Order: Trochida
- Superfamily: Trochoidea
- Family: Solariellidae
- Genus: Ilanga
- Species: I. lirellata

Binomial name
- Ilanga lirellata Herbert, 1987

Species of gastropod

Ilanga lirellata is a species of sea snail, a marine gastropod mollusk in the family Solariellidae.

== Description ==
The size of the shell attains 6 mm.

== Distribution ==
This species occurs in the Indian Ocean off KwaZuluNatal, South Africa.
