= Ilanga discus =

Scientific classification
- Kingdom: Animalia
- Phylum: Mollusca
- Class: Gastropoda
- Subclass: Vetigastropoda
- Order: Trochida
- Superfamily: Trochoidea
- Family: Solariellidae
- Genus: Ilanga
- Species: I. discus

Binomial name
- Ilanga discus Herbert, 1987

Species of gastropod

Ilanga discus is a species of sea snail, a marine gastropod mollusk in the family Solariellidae.

== Description ==
The size of the shell attains 10 mm.

== Distribution ==
This species occurs in the Indian Ocean off KwaZuluNatal, South Africa, and Madagascar at a depth of 300 m.
