= Ilanga rhyssomphala =

Scientific classification
- Kingdom: Animalia
- Phylum: Mollusca
- Class: Gastropoda
- Subclass: Vetigastropoda
- Order: Trochida
- Superfamily: Trochoidea
- Family: Solariellidae
- Genus: Ilanga
- Species: I. rhyssomphala

Binomial name
- Ilanga rhyssomphala Herbert, 1987

Species of gastropod

Ilanga rhyssomphala is a species of sea snail, a marine gastropod mollusk in the family Solariellidae.

== Description ==
The size of the shell varies between 5 mm and 7.6 mm.

== Distribution ==
This marine species occurs off KwaZuluNatal to Zululand, South Africa.
