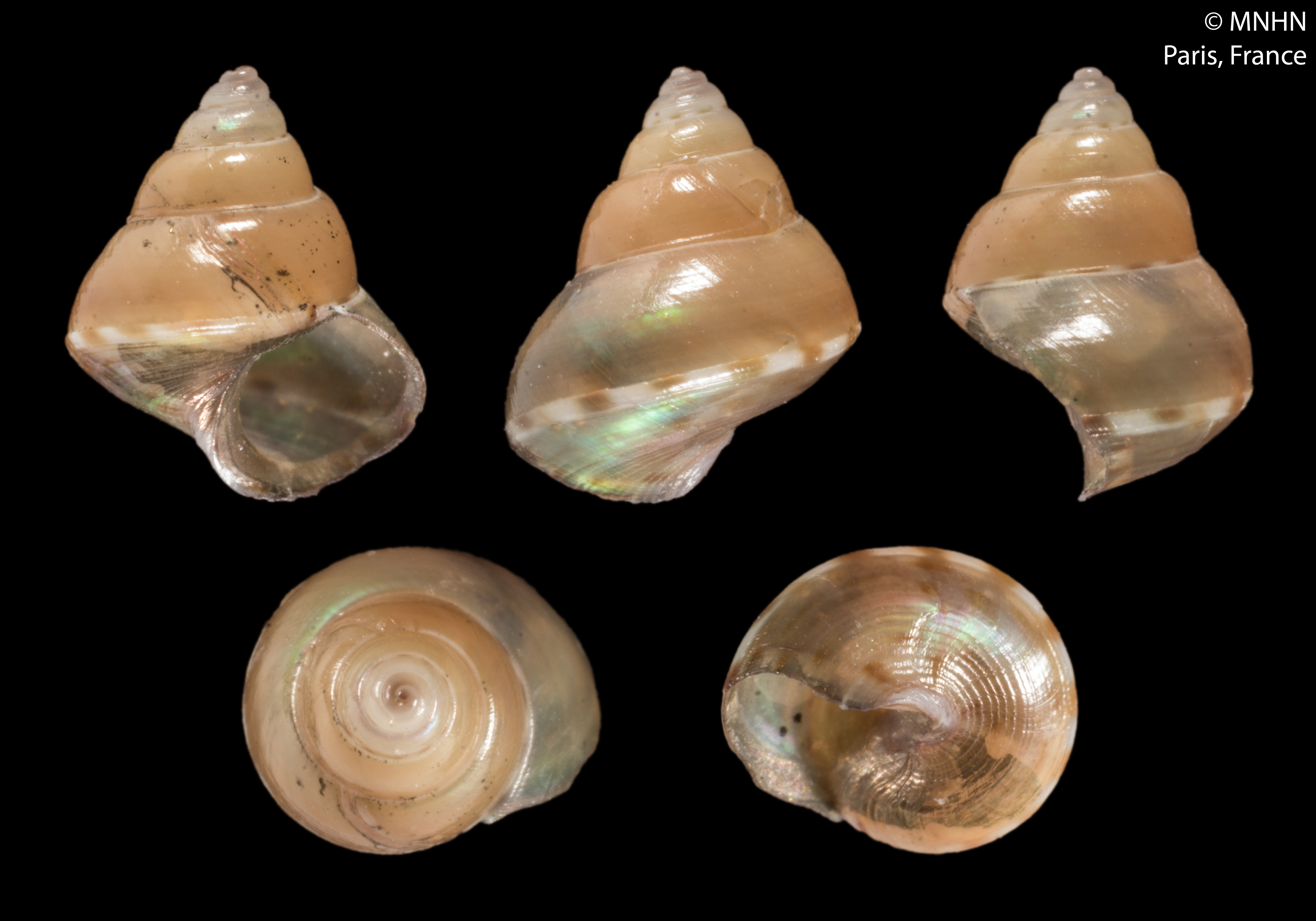
- Shell of Kaiparathina daedala (holotype at MNHN, Paris)

Scientific classification
- Kingdom: Animalia
- Phylum: Mollusca
- Class: Gastropoda
- Subclass: Vetigastropoda
- Order: Trochida
- Family: Trochidae
- Genus: Kaiparathina
- Species: K. daedala

Binomial name
- Kaiparathina daedala Marshall, 1993

= Kaiparathina daedala =

Species of gastropod

Kaiparathina daedala is a species of sea snail, a marine gastropod mollusk in the subfamily Kaiparathininae of the family Trochidae. It belongs to the genus Kaiparathina, which currently comprises seven accepted species.

== Description ==
The length of the shell attains 4.65 mm. The protoconch tip is a purplish brown, the first two whorls are translucent white, the spire whorls and base are a pinkish buff with reddish brown spots and narrow supra and subsutural bands. The shell is mainly smooth with the exception of 14–16 rounded spiral threads ending on the last half of the body whorl.

== Distribution ==
This species occurs in the Indian Ocean off Réunion.

== Taxonomy ==
Kaiparathina daedala belongs to the genus Kaiparathina, which was established by Laws in 1941 and revised by Marshall in 1993. In 2024, a new species, Kaiparathina monticola, was described from Walters Shoal during Cruise MD208 of the Tropical Deep-Sea Benthos programme.

In the same 2024 publication, Cantharidus nolfi Poppe, Tagaro & H. Dekker, 2006 was transferred to Kaiparathina.
