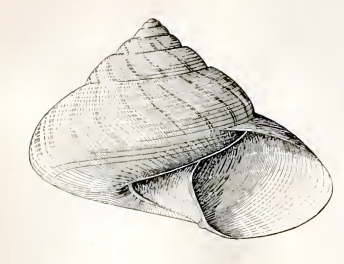
- Original drawing of a shell of Archiminolia oleata

Scientific classification
- Kingdom: Animalia
- Phylum: Mollusca
- Class: Gastropoda
- Subclass: Vetigastropoda
- Order: Trochida
- Superfamily: Trochoidea
- Family: Solariellidae
- Genus: Archiminolia
- Species: A. oleata

Binomial name
- Archiminolia oleata (Hedley & Petterd, 1906)

Synonyms
- Archiminolia oleacea (Hedley & Petterd, 1906) ( wrong spelling); Monilea oleacea Hedley & Petterd, 1906 (wrong spelling); Monilea oleata Hedley & Petterd, 1906 (original combination)

= Archiminolia oleata =

Species of gastropod

Archiminolia oleata, common name the shining top shell, is a species of sea snail, a marine gastropod mollusk in the family Solariellidae.

== Description ==
(Original description by Hedley & Petterd) The height of the shell attains 12 mm, its diameter 16 mm. The thin shell is rather large and regularly turbinate with an elevated spire. The base of the shell is flattened. The periphery is subangled. The seven whorls increase gradually in size. They are regularly rounded except a narrow flat step below the suture. Colour of the shell is white beneath, and above pale cinnamon with darker radial streaks on the body whorl. The entire surface is glossy, as if well oiled. The sculpture is closely scored by sharp spiral cuts, which are deepest about the periphery, fainter midway up the whorl and vanish from the base and from the first four whorls. On the penultimate whorl between the insertion of the lip and the suture, there are sixteen of these impressed spirals. The flat interspaces are obliquely ci'ossed by faint irregular growth lines. The aperture is very oblique ovate. Its upper insertion is carried far forward, connected with the lower by a thin dull film of callus. The lip is quite sharp, within a white edge is followed by a brown border and that again by a nacreous layer. This sequence again appears along the interior suture. The umbilicus forms a broad open funnel, penetrating to the initial whorl, margined by a beaded funicle which ends in an expansion on the columella base. The interior of the umbilicus is spirally scored like the periphery, and is undercut at the junction of each whorl.

== Distribution ==
This marine species is endemic to Australia at occurs off New South Wales, South Australia, Tasmania, Victoria.
