= Ilanga whitechurchi =

Scientific classification
- Kingdom: Animalia
- Phylum: Mollusca
- Class: Gastropoda
- Subclass: Vetigastropoda
- Order: Trochida
- Superfamily: Trochoidea
- Family: Solariellidae
- Genus: Ilanga
- Species: I. whitechurchi

Binomial name
- Ilanga whitechurchi (Turton, 1932)

Synonyms
- Gibbula whitechurchi Turton, 1932

Species of gastropod

Ilanga whitechurchi is a species of sea snail, a marine gastropod mollusk in the family Solariellidae.

== Description ==
The size of the shell attains 7.6 mm.

== Distribution ==
This marine species occurs off the Agulhas Bank, South Africa.
