= Ilanga platypeza =

Scientific classification
- Kingdom: Animalia
- Phylum: Mollusca
- Class: Gastropoda
- Subclass: Vetigastropoda
- Order: Trochida
- Superfamily: Trochoidea
- Family: Solariellidae
- Genus: Ilanga
- Species: I. platypeza

Binomial name
- Ilanga platypeza Herbert, 1987

Species of gastropod

Ilanga platypeza is a species of sea snail, a marine gastropod mollusk in the family Solariellidae.

== Description ==
The size of the shell varies between 4.4 mm and 6.3 mm.

== Distribution ==
This marine species occurs off Southwest Transkei to the Eastern Cape Province, South Africa
