= Bathymophila euspira =

Scientific classification
- Kingdom: Animalia
- Phylum: Mollusca
- Class: Gastropoda
- Subclass: Vetigastropoda
- Order: Trochida
- Superfamily: Trochoidea
- Family: Solariellidae
- Genus: Bathymophila
- Species: B. euspira

Binomial name
- Bathymophila euspira (Dall, 1881)

Synonyms
- Margarita euspira Dall, 1881 (original combination); Margarites euspira (Dall, 1881); Margarita nitens Dall, 1881; Trochus coronatus Jeffreys, 1883; Trochus euspira (Dall, 1881)

Species of mollusc

Bathymophila euspira is a species of sea snail, a marine gastropod mollusk in the family Solariellidae.

== Description ==
The height of the shell attains 7 mm. The conical shell is elevated, with a rather obtuse apex. It is shining and pearly white. It contains five whorls. The nucleus is translucent, white, and with a sculpture of strong revolving threads, of which that nearest to the suture is most pronounced, and continues, at first sharp, then with slight waves, then with oblique waves like the lay of a stranded rope. On the body whorl there is a succession of well-elevated pinched-up points forming a band next the suture. The others disappear on the third whorl, and for the rest the shell is only marked by faint lines of growth here and there, a little more pronounced in the vicinity of the umbilical callus. The periphery has a tendency to carination. The base of the shell is rounded. The oblique aperture is rounded with a sharp margin. The simple columella is stout, thick, inseparable from a thick white callus which forms a lump over the umbilical pit. The end of the columella (broken in specimens seen so far) apparently form a sort of lump or thickened angle. The suture is distinct throughout.

== Distribution ==
This species occurs in the following locations at depths between 713 m and 1472 m:

- Caribbean Sea
- Cuba, Puerto Rico
- Gulf of Mexico
