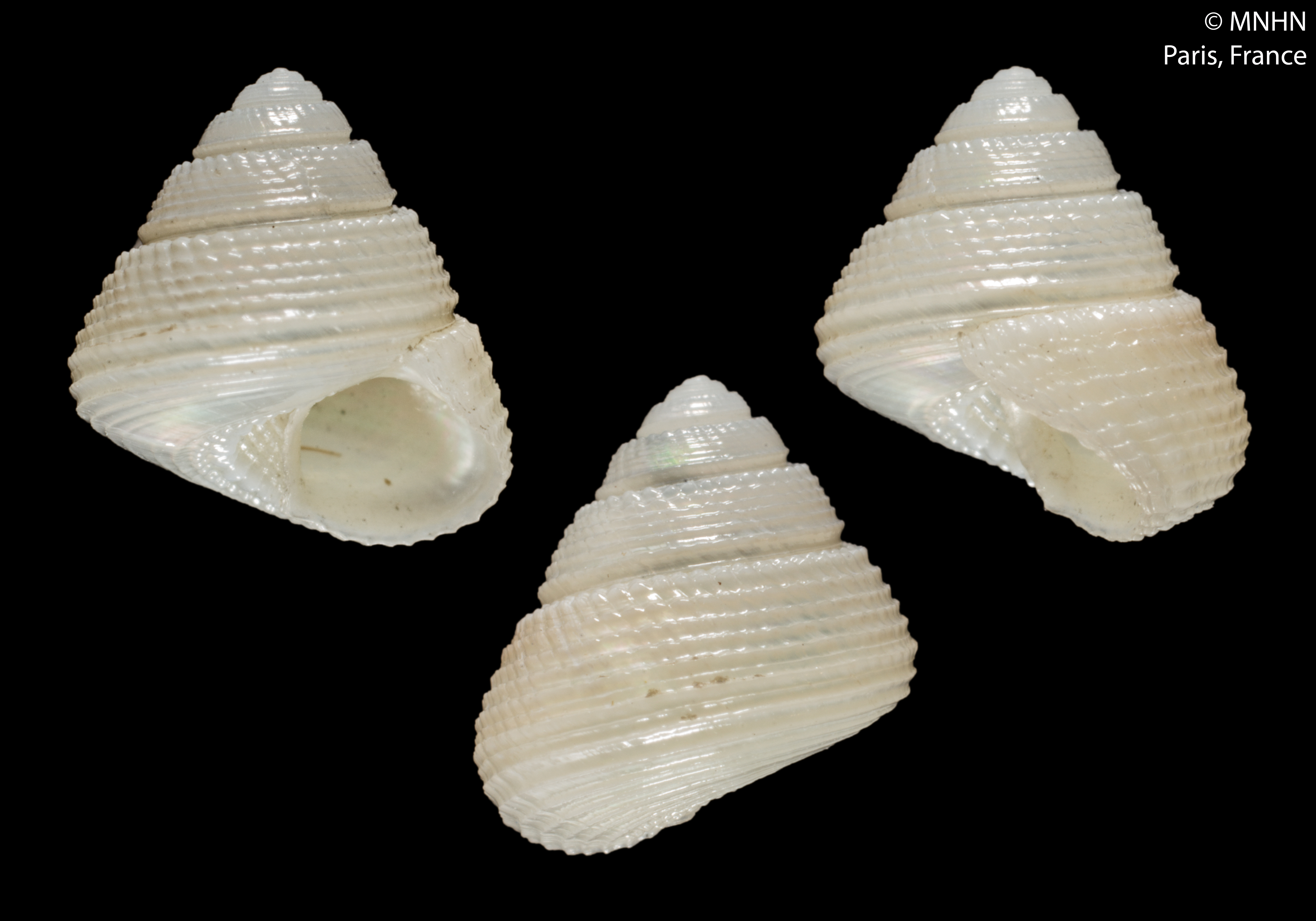
- Shell of Arxellia trochos (holotype at MNHN, Paris)

Scientific classification
- Kingdom: Animalia
- Phylum: Mollusca
- Class: Gastropoda
- Subclass: Vetigastropoda
- Order: Trochida
- Superfamily: Trochoidea
- Family: Solariellidae
- Genus: Arxellia; Vilvens, Williams & Herbert, 2014

Type species
- Arxellia trochos Vilvens, Williams & Herbert, 2014

= Arxellia =

Genus of gastropods

Arxellia is a genus of sea snails, marine gastropod mollusks, in the family Solariellidae.

== Species ==
Species within the genus Arxellia include:

- Arxellia boucheti Vilvens, Williams & Herbert, 2014
- Arxellia erythrea Vilvens, Williams & Herbert, 2014
- Arxellia helicoides Vilvens, Williams & Herbert, 2014
- Arxellia herosae Vilvens, Williams & Herbert, 2014
- Arxellia maestratii Vilvens, Williams & Herbert, 2014
- Arxellia tenorioi (Poppe, Tagaro & Dekker, 2006)
- Arxellia thaumasta Vilvens, Williams & Herbert, 2014
- Arxellia tracheia Vilvens, Williams & Herbert, 2014
- Arxellia trochos Vilvens, Williams & Herbert, 2014
