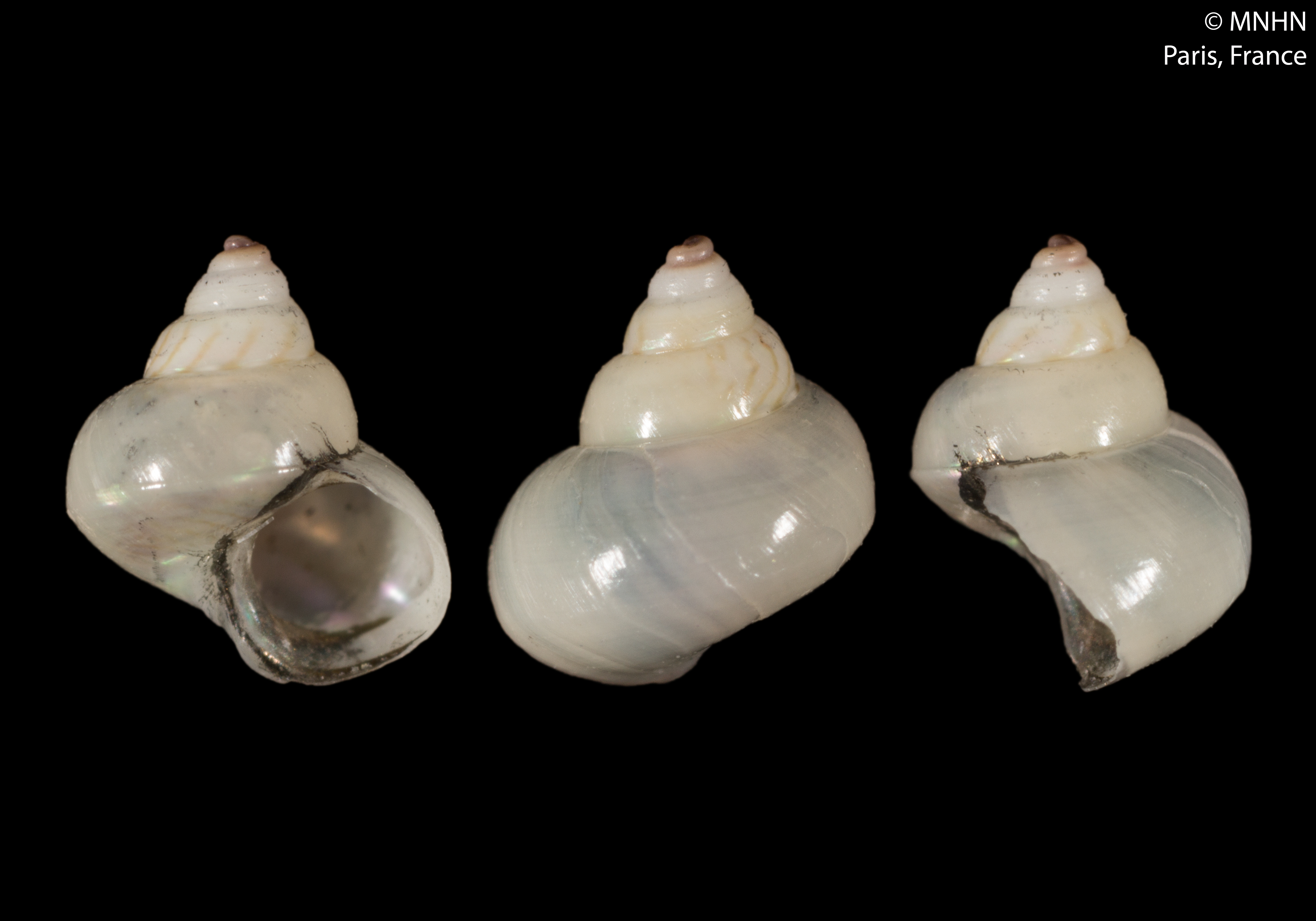
- Shell of Kaiparathina vaubani (holotype at MNHN, Paris)

Scientific classification
- Kingdom: Animalia
- Phylum: Mollusca
- Class: Gastropoda
- Subclass: Vetigastropoda
- Order: Trochida
- Family: Trochidae
- Genus: Kaiparathina
- Species: K. vaubani

Binomial name
- Kaiparathina vaubani Marshall, 1993

= Kaiparathina vaubani =

Species of gastropod

Kaiparathina vaubani is a species of sea snail, a marine gastropod mollusk in the family Trochidae.

== Description ==
The length of the shell attains 3.7 mm.

== Distribution ==
This marine species occurs off New Caledonia.
