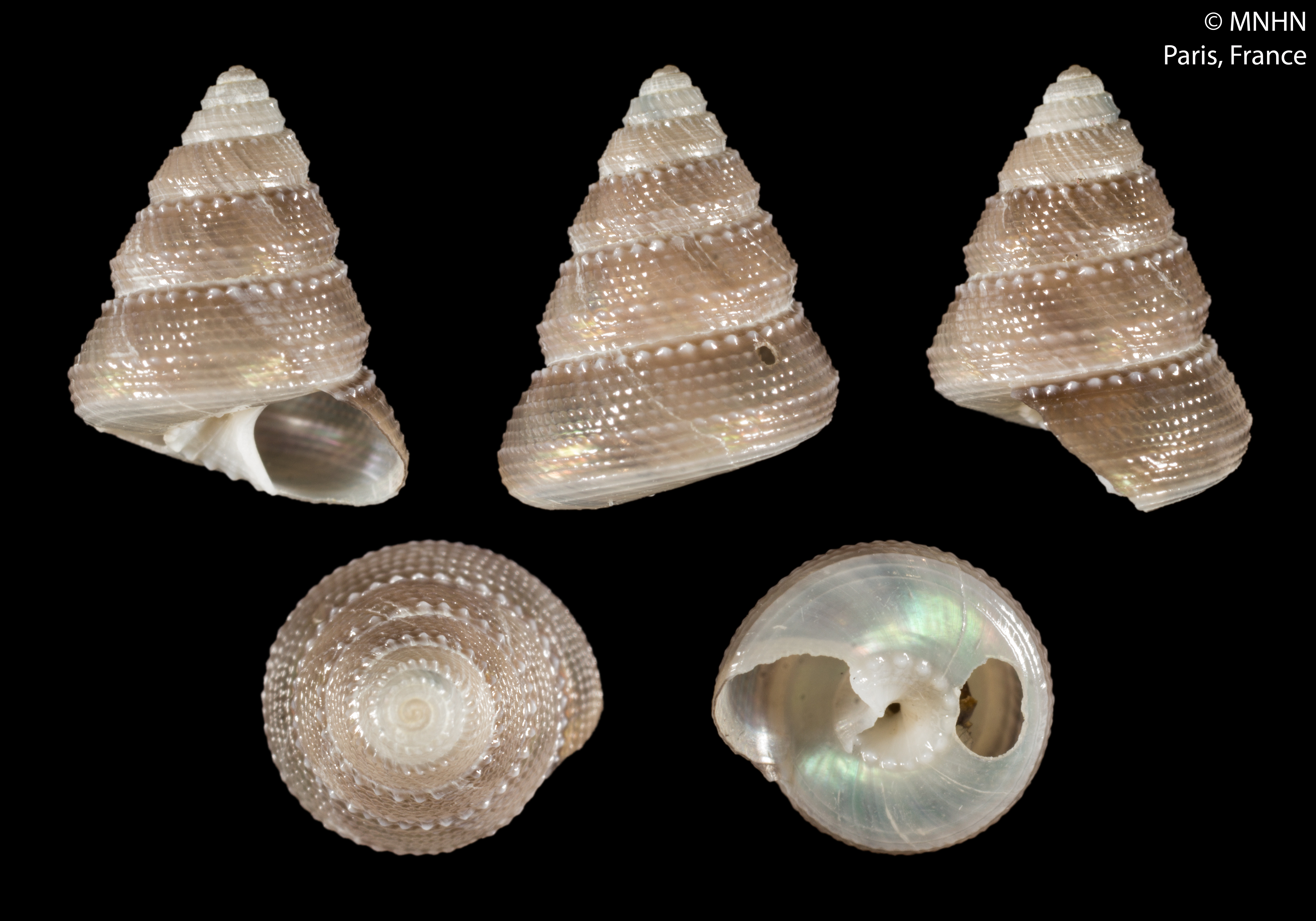
- Shell of Arxellia helicoides (holotype at MNHN, Paris)

Scientific classification
- Kingdom: Animalia
- Phylum: Mollusca
- Class: Gastropoda
- Subclass: Vetigastropoda
- Order: Trochida
- Superfamily: Trochoidea
- Family: Solariellidae
- Genus: Arxellia
- Species: A. helicoides

Binomial name
- Arxellia helicoides Vilvens, Williams & Herbert, 2014

= Arxellia helicoides =

Species of gastropod

Arxellia helicoides is a species of sea snail, a marine gastropod mollusk, in the family Solariellidae.
