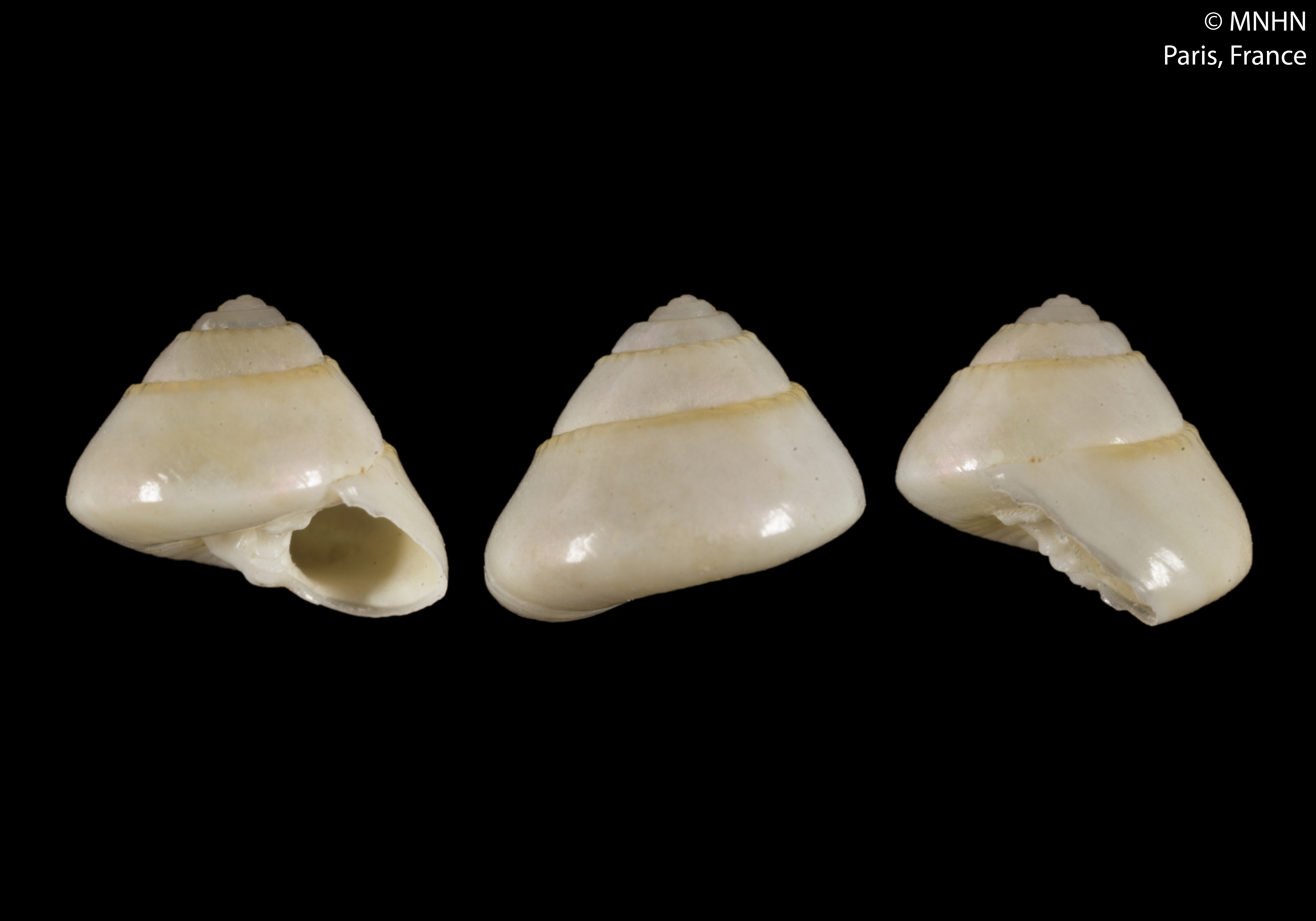
- Shell of Bathymophila aages (holotype at MNHN, Paris)

Scientific classification
- Kingdom: Animalia
- Phylum: Mollusca
- Class: Gastropoda
- Subclass: Vetigastropoda
- Order: Trochida
- Superfamily: Trochoidea
- Family: Solariellidae
- Genus: Bathymophila
- Species: B. aages

Binomial name
- Bathymophila aages Vilvens, 2009

= Bathymophila aages =

Species of gastropod

Bathymophila aages is a species of sea snail, a marine gastropod mollusk in the family Solariellidae.

== Description ==
The size of the shell attains 4.6 mm. The shell usually looks circular and pale.

== Distribution ==
This marine species occurs off Indonesia.
