= Arxellia thaumasta =

Scientific classification
- Kingdom: Animalia
- Phylum: Mollusca
- Class: Gastropoda
- Subclass: Vetigastropoda
- Order: Trochida
- Superfamily: Trochoidea
- Family: Solariellidae
- Genus: Arxellia
- Species: A. thaumasta

Binomial name
- Arxellia thaumasta Vilvens, Williams & Herbert, 2014

Species of gastropod

Arxellia thaumasta is a species of sea snail, a marine gastropod mollusk, in the family Solariellidae.
