= Ilanga humillima =

Scientific classification
- Kingdom: Animalia
- Phylum: Mollusca
- Class: Gastropoda
- Subclass: Vetigastropoda
- Order: Trochida
- Superfamily: Trochoidea
- Family: Solariellidae
- Genus: Ilanga
- Species: I. humillima

Binomial name
- Ilanga humillima (Thiele, 1925)

Synonyms
- Ilanga millardi Herbert, 1987; Solariella humillima Thiele, 1925

Species of gastropod

Ilanga humillima is a species of sea snail, a marine gastropod mollusk, in the family Solariellidae.

== Distribution ==
This species occurs in South Africa (country).
