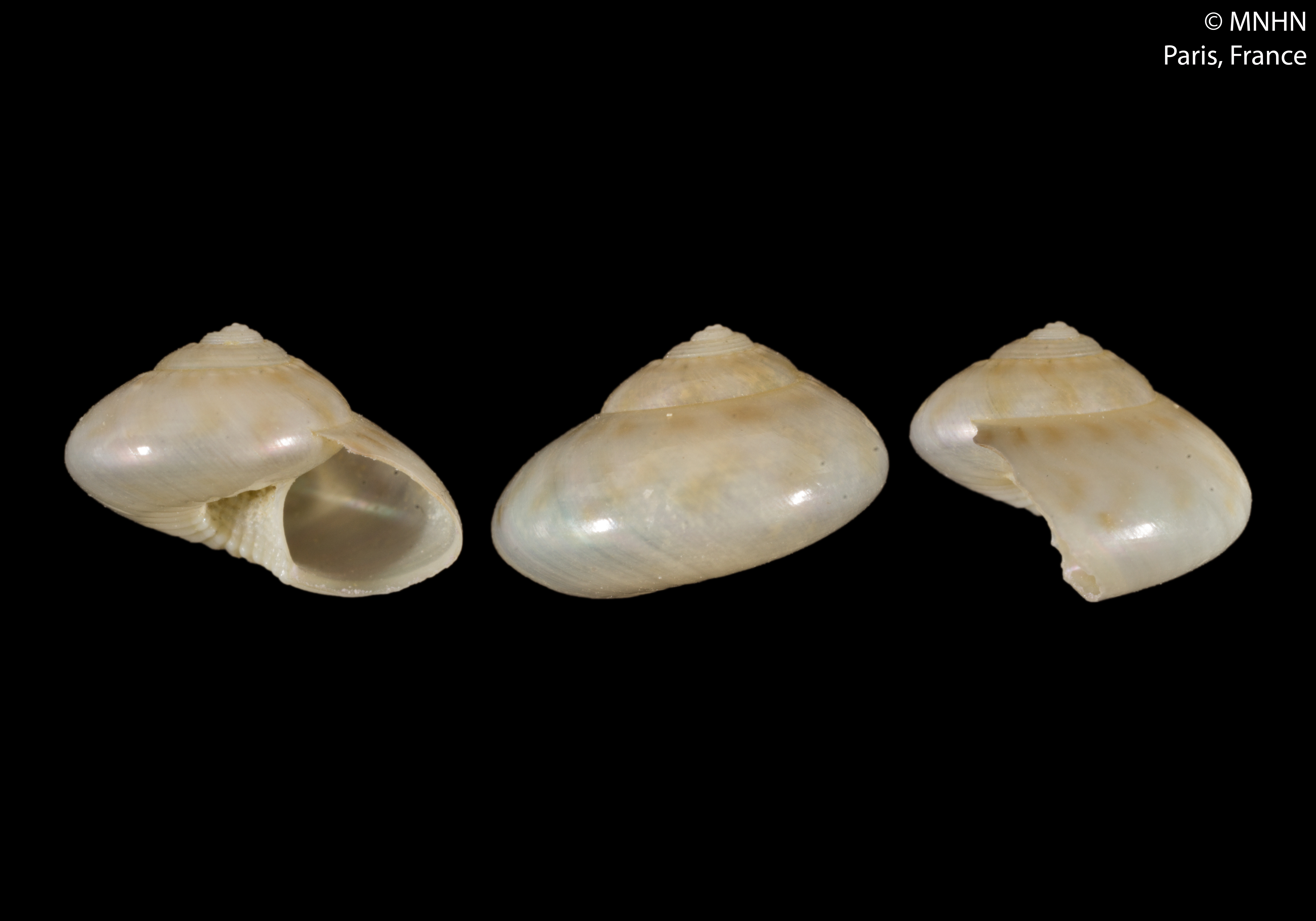
- Shell of Archiminolia ptykte (holotype at MNHN, Paris)

Scientific classification
- Kingdom: Animalia
- Phylum: Mollusca
- Class: Gastropoda
- Subclass: Vetigastropoda
- Order: Trochida
- Superfamily: Trochoidea
- Family: Solariellidae
- Genus: Ilanga
- Species: I. ptykte

Binomial name
- Ilanga ptykte (Vilvens, 2009)

= Ilanga ptykte =

Species of gastropod

Ilanga ptykte is a species of sea snail, a marine gastropod mollusk in the family Solariellidae.

== Description ==
The size of the shell attains 5.2 mm.

== Distribution ==
This marine species occurs off Indonesia.
