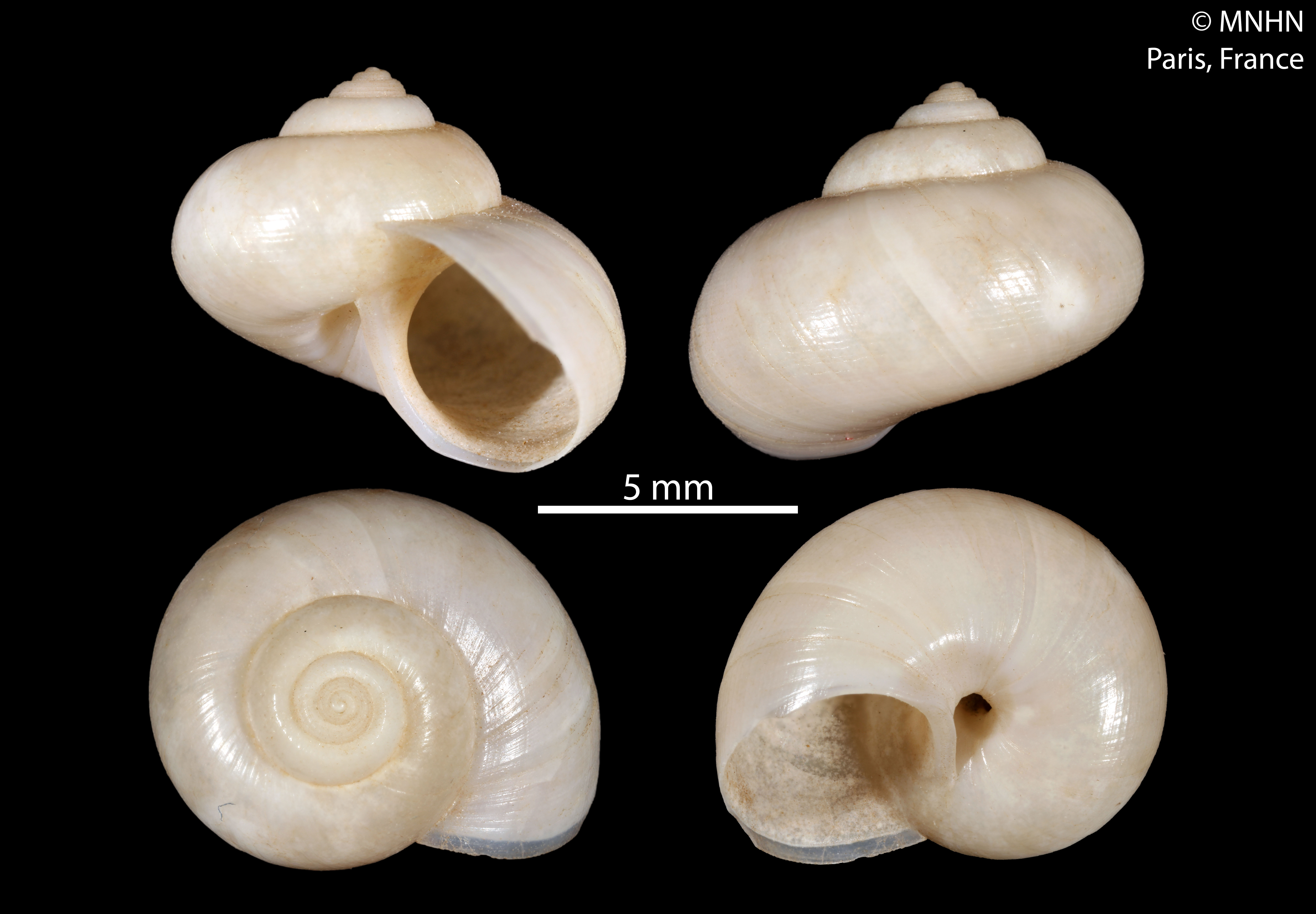
- Shell of Archiminolia ostreion (paratype at MNHN, Paris)

Scientific classification
- Kingdom: Animalia
- Phylum: Mollusca
- Class: Gastropoda
- Subclass: Vetigastropoda
- Order: Trochida
- Superfamily: Trochoidea
- Family: Solariellidae
- Genus: Archiminolia
- Species: A. ostreion

Binomial name
- Archiminolia ostreion Vilvens, 2009

= Archiminolia ostreion =

Species of gastropod

Archiminolia ostreion is a species of sea snail, a marine gastropod mollusk in the family Solariellidae.

== Distribution ==
This marine species occurs off Indonesia and Taiwan.
