= Kaiparathina fasciata =

Scientific classification
- Kingdom: Animalia
- Phylum: Mollusca
- Class: Gastropoda
- Subclass: Vetigastropoda
- Order: Trochida
- Family: Trochidae
- Genus: Kaiparathina
- Species: K. fasciata

Binomial name
- Kaiparathina fasciata Marshall, 1993

Species of gastropod

Kaiparathina fasciata is a species of sea snail, a marine gastropod mollusk in the family Trochidae.

== Distribution ==
This marine species occurs off the Southern Norfolk Ridge, New Caledonia
