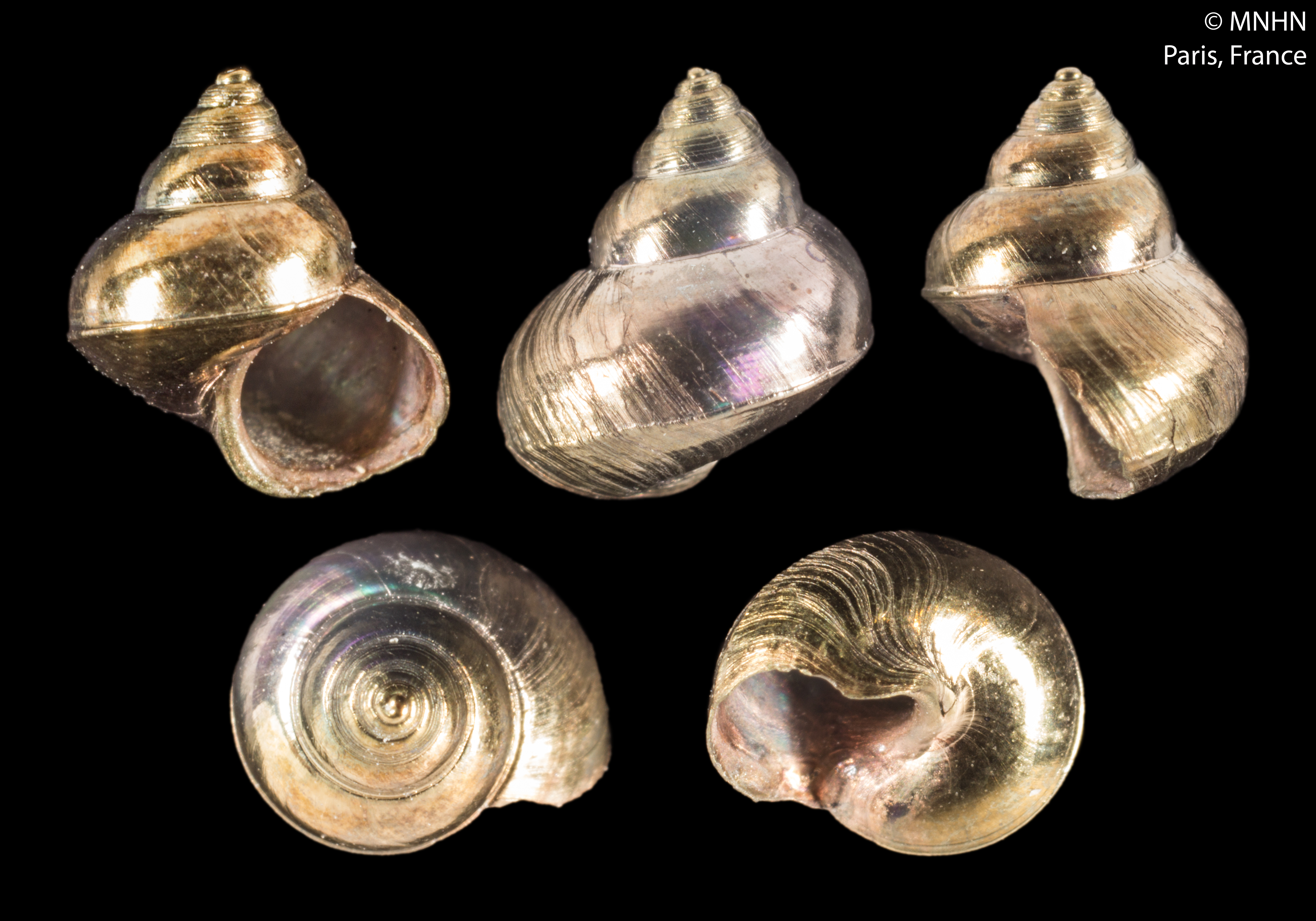
- Shell of Kaiparathina boucheti (holotype at MNHN, Paris)

Scientific classification
- Kingdom: Animalia
- Phylum: Mollusca
- Class: Gastropoda
- Subclass: Vetigastropoda
- Order: Trochida
- Family: Trochidae
- Genus: Kaiparathina
- Species: K. boucheti

Binomial name
- Kaiparathina boucheti Marshall, 1993

= Kaiparathina boucheti =

Species of gastropod

Kaiparathina boucheti is a species of small sea snail, a marine gastropod mollusk in the family Trochidae.

== Description ==
The length of the shell attains 5.45 mm.

== Distribution ==
This marine species occurs off New Caledonia.
