= Microgaza vetula =

Scientific classification
- Kingdom: Animalia
- Phylum: Mollusca
- Class: Gastropoda
- Subclass: Vetigastropoda
- Order: Trochida
- Superfamily: Trochoidea
- Family: Solariellidae
- Genus: Microgaza
- Species: M. vetula

Binomial name
- Microgaza vetula Woodring, 1928

Synonyms
- Microgaza (Microgaza) rotella vetula Woodring, 1928

Species of gastropod

Microgaza vetula is a species of sea snail, a marine gastropod mollusk in the family Solariellidae.

== Description ==
The size of the shell attains 7 mm.

== Distribution ==
This species occurs in the Atlantic Ocean off the Bahamas at depths between 119 m and 192 m.
