= Ilanga maculicincta =

Scientific classification
- Kingdom: Animalia
- Phylum: Mollusca
- Class: Gastropoda
- Subclass: Vetigastropoda
- Order: Trochida
- Superfamily: Trochoidea
- Family: Solariellidae
- Genus: Ilanga
- Species: I. maculicincta

Binomial name
- Ilanga maculicincta Herbert, 1987

Species of gastropod

Ilanga maculicincta is a species of sea snail, a marine gastropod mollusk in the family Solariellidae.

== Description ==
The size of the shell attains 8.6 mm.

== Distribution ==
The marine species occurs off KwaZuluNatal to Southwest Transkei, Rep. South Africa.
