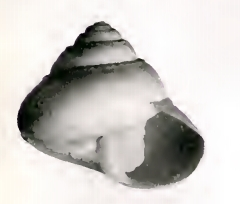
- Original drawing of a shell of Bathymophila micans

Scientific classification
- Kingdom: Animalia
- Phylum: Mollusca
- Class: Gastropoda
- Subclass: Vetigastropoda
- Order: Trochida
- Superfamily: Trochoidea
- Family: Solariellidae
- Genus: Bathymophila
- Species: B. micans

Binomial name
- Bathymophila micans (Dautzenberg & Fischer, 1896)

Synonyms
- Solariella micans Dautzenberg & H. Fischer, 1896

= Bathymophila micans =

Species of gastropod

Bathymophila micans is a species of sea snail, a marine gastropod mollusk in the family Solariellidae.

== Description ==
The shell attains a height of 7 mm and a diameter of 7½ mm. The relatively thin shell is narrowly perforated and has a trochiform shape. Its white surface is highly lustrous with nacreous reflections. The conic spire occupies half the shell's length. It contains five slightly convex whorls, separated by a well-marked suture. At the top of each whorl, near the suture, there is a very narrow, decurrent zone with numerous longitudinal striae. These striae end at the zone's angle in a series of small tubercles. The remaining surface shows faint growth lines. At the base of the body whorl, a very subtle granular row borders the umbilical region. The aperture is subquadrangular. The broad columella is slightly arcuate and terminates with a blunt tooth. The outer lip is thin.

== Distribution ==
This marine species occurs in European waters at bathyal depths (861 m to 1385 m) off the Azores and on the Galicia Bank in the Northeast Atlantic Ocean.
