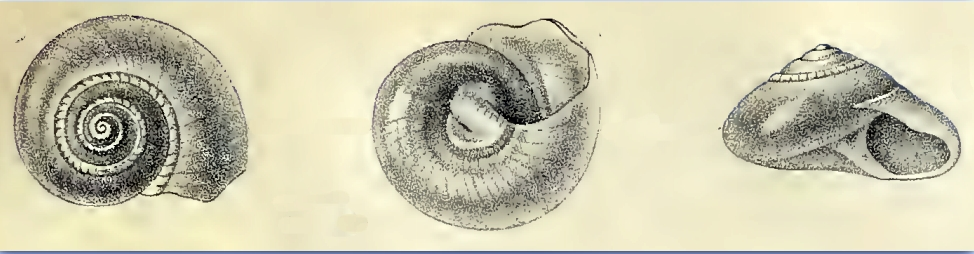
- Original drawing with three views of a shell of Bathymophila callomphala

Scientific classification
- Kingdom: Animalia
- Phylum: Mollusca
- Class: Gastropoda
- Subclass: Vetigastropoda
- Order: Trochida
- Superfamily: Trochoidea
- Family: Solariellidae
- Genus: Bathymophila
- Species: B. callomphala

Binomial name
- Bathymophila callomphala (Schepman, 1908)

Synonyms
- Solariella (Ethaliopsis) callomphala Schepman, 1908

= Bathymophila callomphala =

Species of gastropod

Bathymophila callomphala is a species of sea snail, a marine gastropod mollusk in the family Solariellidae.

== Description ==
(Original description by M. Schepman) The polished, nacreous shell has a depressed-conical, shape. It has a thin, pellucid, white, external layer and often a yellow line below the suture. It contains 4 to 5 whorls. The nucleus is smooth, the subsequent 2 whorls are microscopically spirally striate, crossed by weaker growth-striae. The last 2½ whorls are smooth, with only very faint, traces of growth-striae and spiral striae, but with a row of oval beads, just below the conspicuous suture. The periphery is rounded. The base of the shell is nearly flat, impressed near the centre, which is more or less filled by a thick callus, which is white, with radiating striae on its external margin, granular near the columellar margin, and is ornamented there, with 4 or 5 granules. The base of the shell round the callus, is likewise provided with radiating grooves. The aperture is subtriangularly rounded, very oblique. The outer margin is thin, slightly thickened interiorly. The columellar margin is thickened, its upper end pressed to the body whorl, with a thin layer connecting the margins. The yellow operculum is externally concave.

The shell varies in altitude, in the presence or absence of the yellow subsutural line and especially in the characters of the umbilicus, which is either closed, or more or less open. This is not dependent on age.

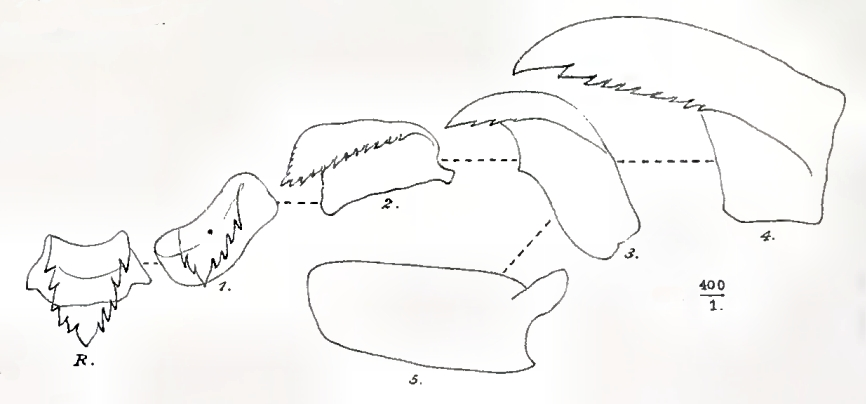
Radula of Bathymophila calliomphala; rhachidian tooth and laterals

The radula is short, with a rather restricted number of uncini, and the shape of the teeth agrees with that of the known species. The rhachidian tooth has a subquadrate body, narrower in front, with a concave upper and convex basal margin. Its cusp is large, longer than the base, with about 4 to 6 denticles on each side of the median denticle. The first lateral has a subquadrate body. Its cusp has very small denticles, at its proximal, more conspicuous ones at its distal margin. The second lateral has a similar body, with a larger cusp and more numerous denticles at its distal margin. The body of the third lateral is elongate, with a moderate cusp and only a few denticles. The fourth has a very large cusp, with about 10 small denticles and a rhombic body. Moreover, I see a fifth lateral without a cusp. Perhaps this tooth exists in many or all the species, but it is so much covered by the other teeth in their normal position, that it may be easily overlooked. The uncini are not very numerous, and as far as I can see, they have simple cusps.

== Distribution ==
This marine species occurs off Indonesia.
