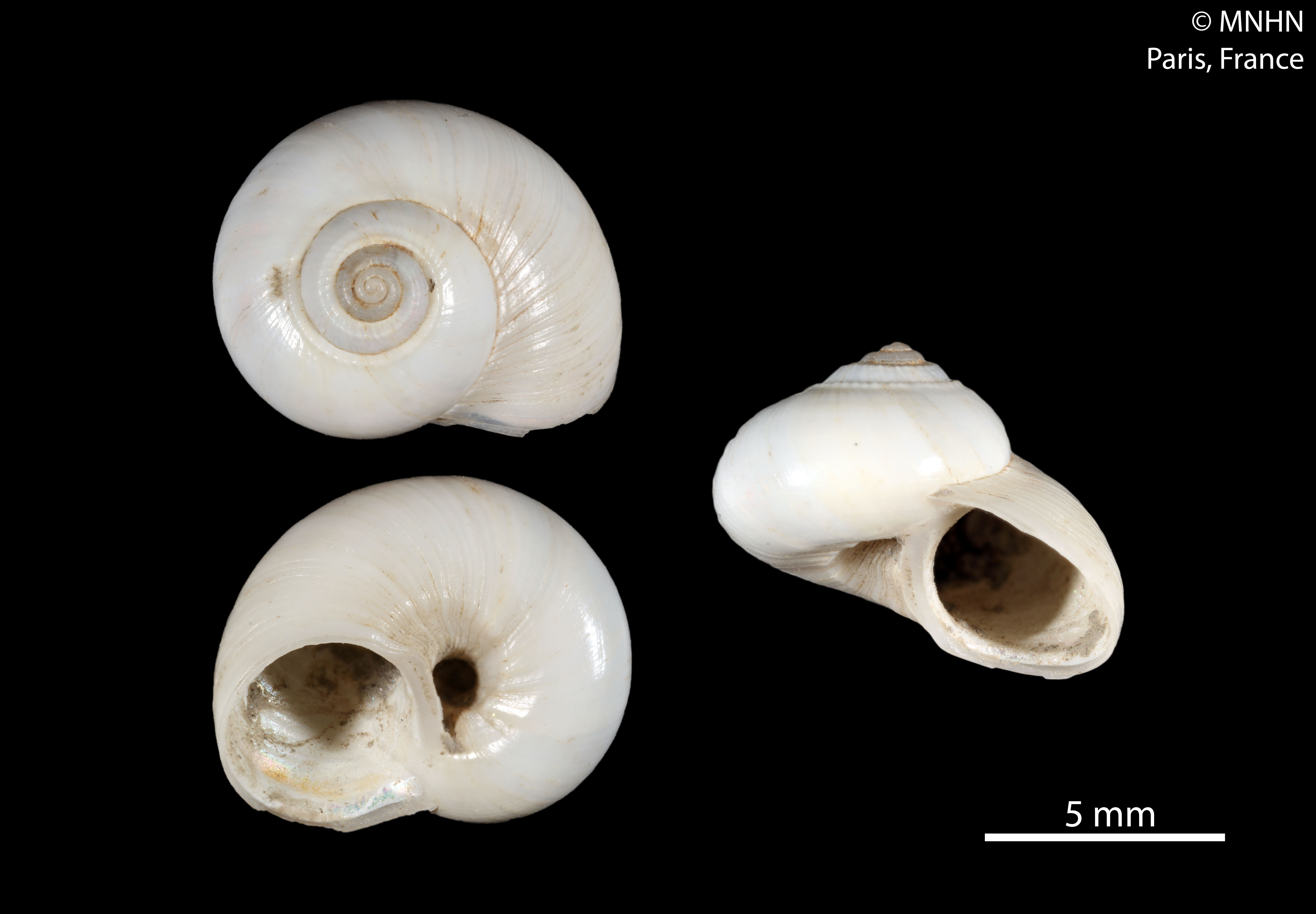
- Shell of Archiminolia strobilos (paratype at MNHN, Paris)

Scientific classification
- Kingdom: Animalia
- Phylum: Mollusca
- Class: Gastropoda
- Subclass: Vetigastropoda
- Order: Trochida
- Superfamily: Trochoidea
- Family: Solariellidae
- Genus: Archiminolia
- Species: A. strobilos

Binomial name
- Archiminolia strobilos Vilvens, 2009

= Archiminolia strobilos =

Species of gastropod

Archiminolia strobilos is a species of sea snail, a marine gastropod mollusk in the family Solariellidae.
