= Archiminolia wanganellica =

Scientific classification
- Kingdom: Animalia
- Phylum: Mollusca
- Class: Gastropoda
- Subclass: Vetigastropoda
- Order: Trochida
- Superfamily: Trochoidea
- Family: Solariellidae
- Genus: Archiminolia
- Species: A. wanganellica

Binomial name
- Archiminolia wanganellica Marshall, 1999

Species of gastropod

Archiminolia wanganellica is a species of sea snail, a marine gastropod mollusk in the family Solariellidae.

== Description ==
The diameter of the shell attains 8.6 mm.

== Distribution ==
This marine species is endemic to New Zealand and occurs off the Norfolk Ridge at a depth of 113 m.
