= Ilanga polita =

Scientific classification
- Kingdom: Animalia
- Phylum: Mollusca
- Class: Gastropoda
- Subclass: Vetigastropoda
- Order: Trochida
- Superfamily: Trochoidea
- Family: Solariellidae
- Genus: Ilanga
- Species: I. polita

Binomial name
- Ilanga polita Herbert, 1987

Species of gastropod

Ilanga polita is a species of sea snail, a marine gastropod mollusk in the family Solariellidae.

== Description ==
The size of the shell attains 5 mm.

== Distribution ==
This marine species occurs off Transkei, South Africa.
