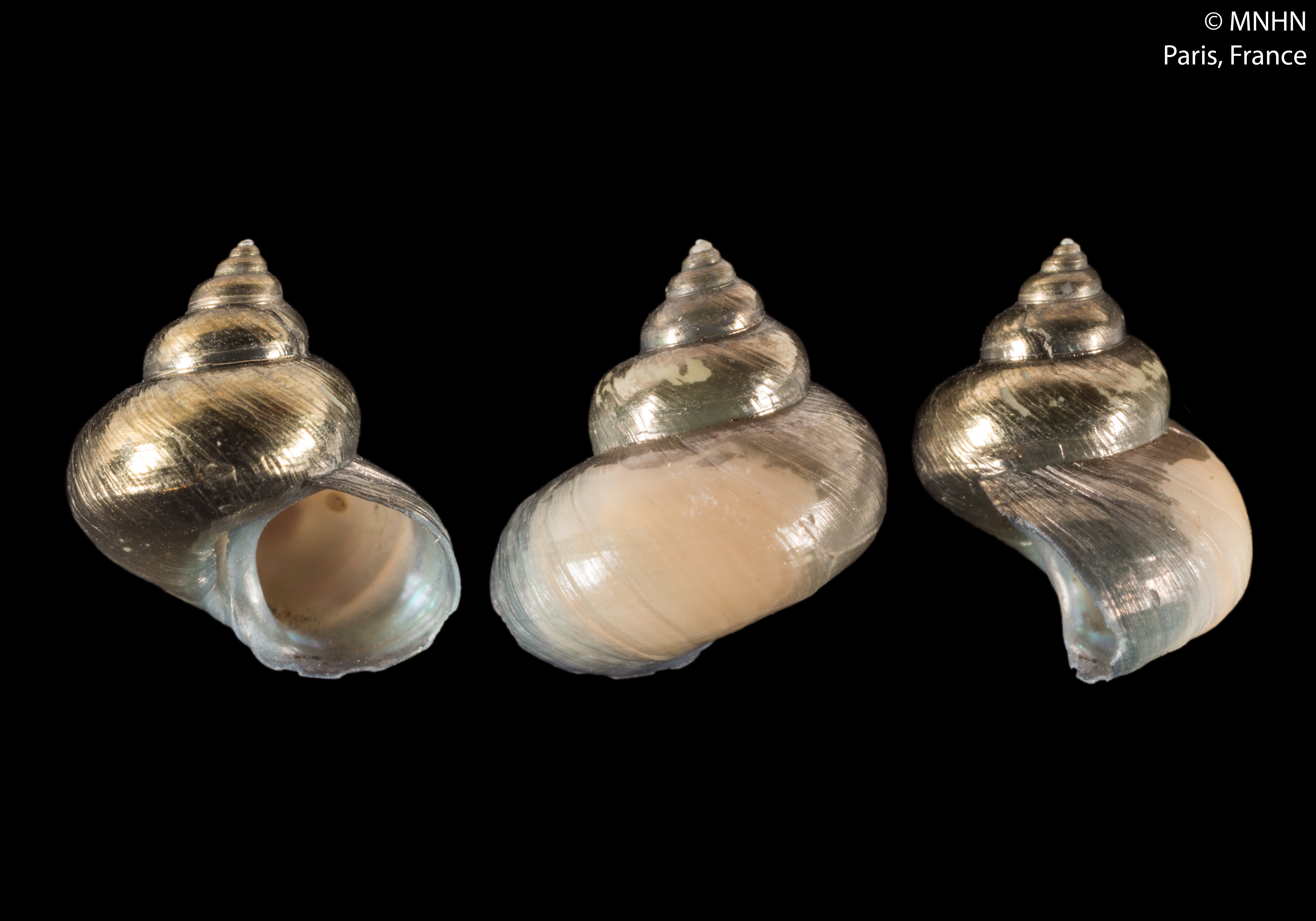
- Shell of Kaiparathina coriolis (holotype at MNHN, Paris)

Scientific classification
- Kingdom: Animalia
- Phylum: Mollusca
- Class: Gastropoda
- Subclass: Vetigastropoda
- Order: Trochida
- Family: Trochidae
- Genus: Kaiparathina
- Species: K. coriolis

Binomial name
- Kaiparathina coriolis Marshall, 1993

= Kaiparathina coriolis =

Species of gastropod

Kaiparathina coriolis is a species of sea snail, a marine gastropod mollusk in the family Trochidae.

== Description ==
The length of the shell attains 10.1 mm. The shell is only found in Lord Howe Rise in the Coral Sea at a level of 340 meters in the continental slope. The last time it was seen was in 1993, by Marshall B.A., and one of the few shells found are being held in the Museum d'Historie Naturelle, in Paris.

Its functional type is Benthos.

Its feeding type is grazer and deposit feeder. Particularly, it feeds off of plants.

== Distribution ==
This marine species occurs off the Northern Lord Howe Rise in the Coral Sea.

It has been sighted in the 1800s off the shore of Hawaii, and since then only in the aforementioned area of Lord Howe Rise, Australia.
