= Ilanga norfolkensis =

Scientific classification
- Kingdom: Animalia
- Phylum: Mollusca
- Class: Gastropoda
- Subclass: Vetigastropoda
- Order: Trochida
- Superfamily: Trochoidea
- Family: Solariellidae
- Genus: Ilanga
- Species: I. norfolkensis

Binomial name
- Ilanga norfolkensis (B. A. Marshall, 1999)

Synonyms
- Microgaza norfolkensis B. A. Marshall, 1999 (original combination)

Species of gastropod

Ilanga norfolkensis is a species of sea snail, a marine gastropod mollusk in the family Solariellidae.

== Distribution ==
This marine species occurs off Norfolk Island and New Caledonia and is found at depths between 568 and 603 m (1,860 and 1,980 ft).
