= Archiminolia hurleyi =

Scientific classification
- Kingdom: Animalia
- Phylum: Mollusca
- Class: Gastropoda
- Subclass: Vetigastropoda
- Order: Trochida
- Superfamily: Trochoidea
- Family: Solariellidae
- Genus: Archiminolia
- Species: A. hurleyi

Binomial name
- Archiminolia hurleyi (B. A. Marshall, 1979)

Synonyms
- Microgaza hurleyi (Marshall, 1979); Solariella (Microgaza) hurleyi Marshall, 1979

Species of gastropod

Archiminolia hurleyi is a species of sea snail, a marine gastropod mollusk in the family Solariellidae.

== Distribution ==
This marine species is endemic to New Zealand.
