= Bathymophila gravida =

Scientific classification
- Kingdom: Animalia
- Phylum: Mollusca
- Class: Gastropoda
- Subclass: Vetigastropoda
- Order: Trochida
- Superfamily: Trochoidea
- Family: Solariellidae
- Genus: Bathymophila
- Species: B. gravida

Binomial name
- Bathymophila gravida (Marshall, 1999)

Species of gastropod

Bathymophila gravida is a species of sea snail, a marine gastropod mollusk in the family Solariellidae.

== Description ==
The diameter of the shell attains 16 mm.

== Distribution ==
This marine species is endemic to New Zealand and occurs at the Three Kings Rise at depths between 1082 m and 1570 m.
