= Archiminolia katoi =

Scientific classification
- Kingdom: Animalia
- Phylum: Mollusca
- Class: Gastropoda
- Subclass: Vetigastropoda
- Order: Trochida
- Superfamily: Trochoidea
- Family: Solariellidae
- Genus: Archiminolia
- Species: A. katoi

Binomial name
- Archiminolia katoi (Kuroda & Habe in Habe, 1961)

Synonyms
- Ethaliopsis katoi Kuroda & Habe, 1961; Microgaza katoi (Kuroda & Habe in Habe, 1961)

Species of gastropod

Archiminolia katoi is a species of sea snail, a marine gastropod mollusk in the family Solariellidae.

== Description ==
The size of the shell varies between 5 mm and 15 mm, conical, and milky-white to pale cream, often translucent. Its surface features spiral cords and axial riblets, creating a grid-like texture. The protoconch is smooth, transitioning sharply to a teleoconch with up to four convex whorls. The narrow umbilicus (10% shell width) and thin outer lip distinguish it from relatives like A. meridiana, which has a broader umbilicus and weaker sculpture. The operculum is multispiral.

== Distribution ==
This marine species occurs off the coast of Japan, the Philippines and New Caledonia.

== Etymology ==
Named for malacologist Makoto Kato; the genus combines Greek archi- ("primitive") and Minolia.

== Sources ==
- Museum of New Zealand: Archiminolia katoi
- Habe, T (1964), Shells of the Western Pacific in Colour, Vol.II, 233pp., 66pls., Hoikusha Publishing Company, Osaka
- Higo, S., Callomon, P. & Goto, Y. (1999) Catalogue and Bibliography of the Marine Shell-Bearing Mollusca of Japan. Elle Scientific Publications, Yao, Japan, 749 pp.
- Vilvens, C.; Williams, S. T. (2016). New genus and new species of Solariellidae (Gastropoda: Trochoidea) from New Caledonia, Fiji, Vanuatu, Solomon Islands, Philippines, Papua New Guinea and French Polynesia. in: Héros, V. et al. (Ed.) Tropical Deep-Sea Benthos 29. Mémoires du Muséum national d'Histoire naturelle (1993). 208: 267-289
