= Bathymophila diadema =

Scientific classification
- Kingdom: Animalia
- Phylum: Mollusca
- Class: Gastropoda
- Subclass: Vetigastropoda
- Order: Trochida
- Superfamily: Trochoidea
- Family: Solariellidae
- Genus: Bathymophila
- Species: B. diadema

Binomial name
- Bathymophila diadema (Marshall, 1999)

Synonyms
- Archiminolia diadema B. A. Marshall, 1999 (original combination)

Species of gastropod

Bathymophila diadema is a species of sea snail, a marine gastropod mollusk in the family Solariellidae.

== Distribution ==
This marine species occurs off Papua New Guinea, New Caledonia, the Solomon Islands and the Loyalty Islands at depths between 367 and 957 m (1,200 and 3,140 ft).
