= Archiminolia iridescens =

Scientific classification
- Kingdom: Animalia
- Phylum: Mollusca
- Class: Gastropoda
- Subclass: Vetigastropoda
- Order: Trochida
- Superfamily: Trochoidea
- Family: Solariellidae
- Genus: Archiminolia
- Species: A. iridescens

Binomial name
- Archiminolia iridescens (Habe, 1961)

Synonyms
- Ethaliopsis iridescens Habe, 1961; Microgaza iridescens (Habe, 1961)

Species of gastropod

Archiminolia iridescens is a species of sea snail, a marine gastropod mollusk in the family Solariellidae.

== Distribution ==
This marine species occurs off Japan.
