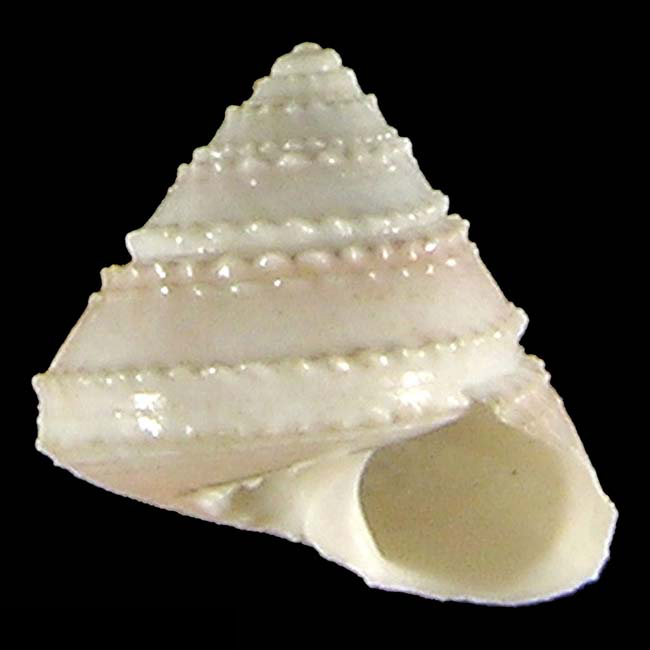

Scientific classification
- Kingdom: Animalia
- Phylum: Mollusca
- Class: Gastropoda
- Subclass: Vetigastropoda
- Order: Trochida
- Superfamily: Trochoidea
- Family: Solariellidae
- Genus: Arxellia
- Species: A. tenorioi

Binomial name
- Arxellia tenorioi (Poppe, Tagaro & Dekker, 2006)

Synonyms
- Bathymophila tenorioi Poppe, Tagaro & Dekker, 2006

= Arxellia tenorioi =

Species of gastropod

Arxellia tenorioi is a species of sea snail, a marine gastropod mollusk, in the family Solariellidae.

== Description ==
The length of the shell varies between 4.7 mm and 5.7 mm.

== Distribution ==
This marine species occurs off the Philippines.
