= Archiminolia ziczac =

Scientific classification
- Kingdom: Animalia
- Phylum: Mollusca
- Class: Gastropoda
- Subclass: Vetigastropoda
- Order: Trochida
- Superfamily: Trochoidea
- Family: Solariellidae
- Genus: Archiminolia
- Species: A. ziczac

Binomial name
- Archiminolia ziczac (Kuroda & Habe, 1971)

Synonyms
- Microgaza ziczac Kuroda & Habe, 1971

Species of gastropod

Archiminolia ziczac is a species of sea snail, a marine gastropod mollusk in the family Solariellidae.

== Description ==
The size of the shell varies between 6 mm and 10 mm.

== Distribution ==
This marine species occurs off the Philippines and Japan.
