= Ilanga konos =

Scientific classification
- Kingdom: Animalia
- Phylum: Mollusca
- Class: Gastropoda
- Subclass: Vetigastropoda
- Order: Trochida
- Superfamily: Trochoidea
- Family: Solariellidae
- Genus: Ilanga
- Species: I. konos

Binomial name
- Ilanga konos (Vilvens, 2009)

Synonyms
- Microgaza konos Vilvens, 2009

Species of sea snail

Ilanga konos is a species of sea snail, a marine gastropod mollusk, in the family Solariellidae.
