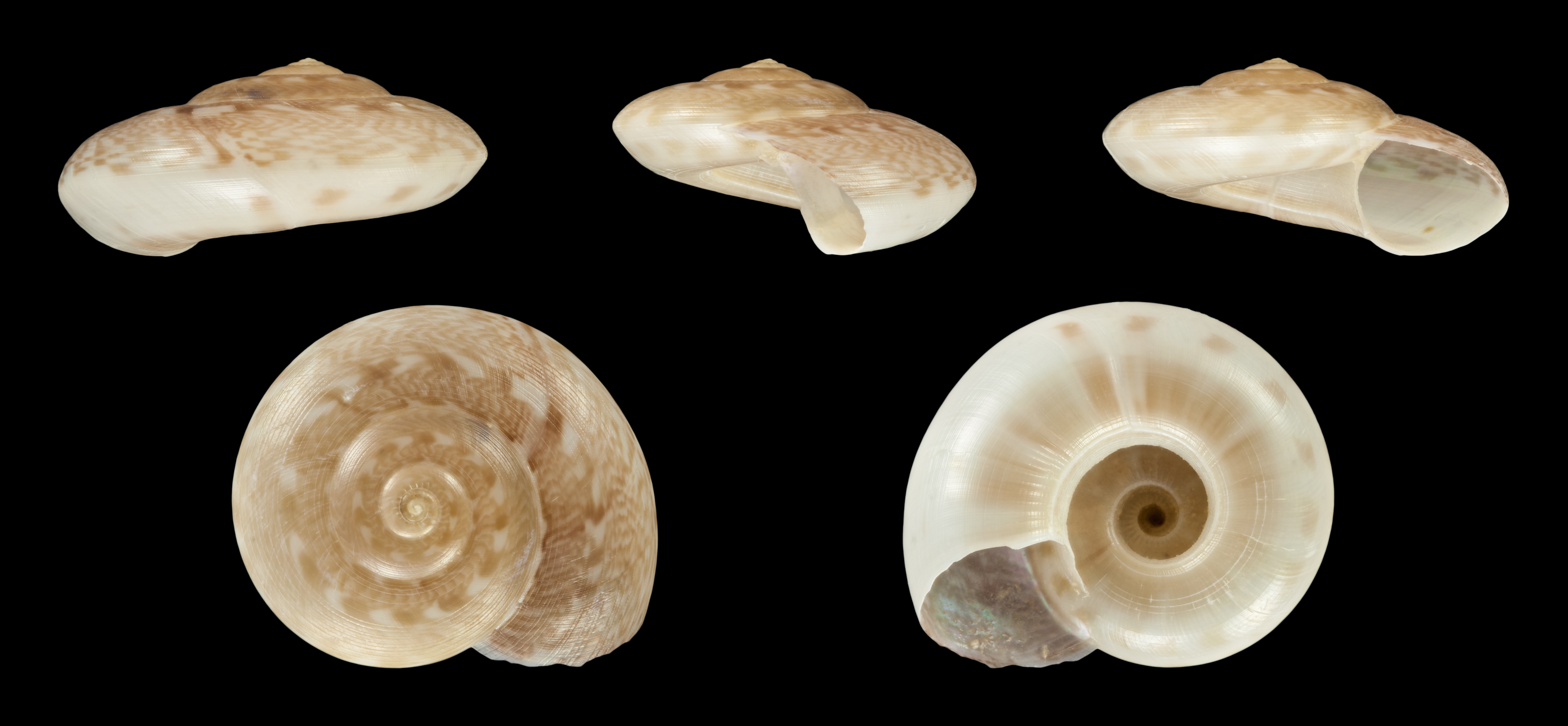
- Shell of Ilanga gotoi

Scientific classification
- Kingdom: Animalia
- Phylum: Mollusca
- Class: Gastropoda
- Subclass: Vetigastropoda
- Order: Trochida
- Family: Solariellidae
- Genus: Ilanga
- Species: I. gotoi

Binomial name
- Ilanga gotoi (Poppe, Tagaro & Dekker, 2006)

Synonyms
- Microgaza gotoi Poppe, Tagaro & Dekker, 2006

= Ilanga gotoi =

Species of gastropod

Ilanga gotoi is a species of sea snail, a marine gastropod mollusk in the family Solariellidae.

== Original description ==
The length of the shell varies between 7 mm and 19 mm. (of Microgaza gotoi Poppe, Tagaro & Dekker, 2006) Poppe G.T., Tagaro S.P. & Dekker H. (2006) The Seguenziidae, Chilodontidae, Trochidae, Calliostomatidae and Solariellidae of the Philippine Islands. Visaya Supplement 2: 1–228. page(s): 130.

== Distribution ==
This marine species occurs off the Philippines.
