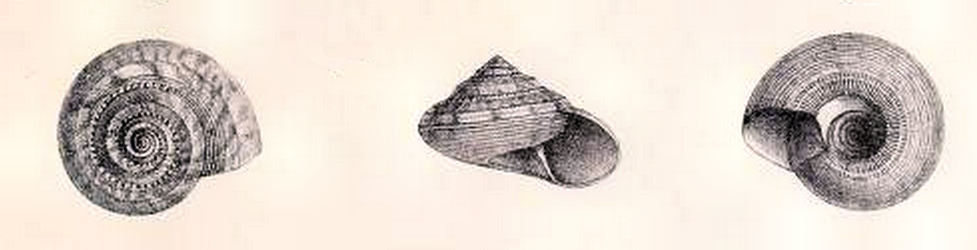
- Original drawing with three views of a shell of Ilanga illustris

Scientific classification
- Kingdom: Animalia
- Phylum: Mollusca
- Class: Gastropoda
- Subclass: Vetigastropoda
- Order: Trochida
- Superfamily: Trochoidea
- Family: Solariellidae
- Genus: Ilanga
- Species: I. illustris

Binomial name
- Ilanga illustris (Sturany, 1904)

Synonyms
- Solariella illustris Sturany, 1904 (original description)

= Ilanga illustris =

Species of gastropod

Ilanga illustris is a species of very small sea snail, a marine gastropod mollusk in the family Solariellidae.

== Description ==
The height of the shell attains 6.4 mm, its diameter is 9.1 mm.

== Distribution ==
This marine species occurs in the Red Sea at depths between 212 m and 700 m.
