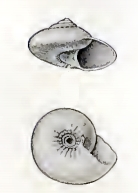
- Original drawing with two views of a shell of Ilanga incisura

Scientific classification
- Kingdom: Animalia
- Phylum: Mollusca
- Class: Gastropoda
- Subclass: Vetigastropoda
- Order: Trochida
- Superfamily: Trochoidea
- Family: Solariellidae
- Genus: Ilanga
- Species: I. incisura

Binomial name
- Ilanga incisura (Melvill, 1909)

Synonyms
- Solariella incisura Melvill, 1909 (original combination)

= Ilanga incisura =

Species of gastropod

Ilanga incisura is a species of small sea snail, a marine gastropod mollusk in the family Solariellidae.

== Description ==
The height of the shell attains 6.3 mm, its diameter is 10.9 mm.

== Distribution ==
This marine species occurs in the Indian Ocean off the Saya de Malha Bank.
