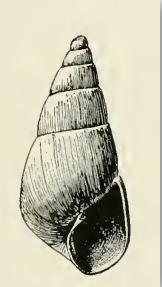
- Apertural view of a shell of Odostomia gravida

Scientific classification
- Kingdom: Animalia
- Phylum: Mollusca
- Class: Gastropoda
- Family: Pyramidellidae
- Genus: Odostomia
- Species: O. gravida

Binomial name
- Odostomia gravida Gould, 1853

Synonyms
- Evalea gravida Dall & Bartsch, 1909; Odostomia californica Dall and Bartsch, 1909; Odostomia (Evalea) gravida Gould, 1853; Odostomia (Evalea) io Dall & Bartsch, 1909

= Odostomia gravida =

Species of gastropod

Odostomia gravida is a species of sea snail, a marine gastropod mollusk in the family Pyramidellidae, the pyrams and their allies.

== Description ==
The large, broadly conic shell measures 6.6 mm. It is milk-white and shining. The whorls of the protoconch are deeply obliquely immersed in the first of the succeeding turns, above which only the tilted edge of the last volution projects. The seven whorls of the teleoconch are moderately rounded, somewhat shouldered at the summit. They are marked by fine lines of growth and numerous, very fine, closely spaced spiral striations. The sutures are well impressed. The periphery of the body whorl is somewhat angulated. The base of the shell is sloping from the periphery to the umbilical area, but slightly rounded. The aperture is ovate. The posterior angle is obtuse. The outer lip is fractured. The columella is short, strong, curved, and revolute, provided with a strong fold at its insertion. The parietal wall is covered with a weak callus.

== Distribution ==
This species occurs in the Pacific Ocean off California.
