= Ilanga navakaensis =

Scientific classification
- Kingdom: Animalia
- Phylum: Mollusca
- Class: Gastropoda
- Subclass: Vetigastropoda
- Order: Trochida
- Superfamily: Trochoidea
- Family: Solariellidae
- Genus: Ilanga
- Species: I. navakaensis

Binomial name
- Ilanga navakaensis (Ladd, 1982)

Synonyms
- † Kaiparathina navakaensis (Ladd, 1982); † Microgaza (Microgaza) navakaensis Ladd, 1982 (basionym); Microgaza navakaensis Ladd, 1982 (original combination)

Species of gastropod

Ilanga navakaensis is a species of sea snail, a marine gastropod mollusk in the family Solariellidae.

It is only known as a fossil.

== Distribution ==
Ilanga navakaensis is known only from the Pleistocene of Vanuatu, but Bruce Marshall (1993) recorded Recent material from New Caledonia as Kaiparathina cf. navakaensis
