= Bathymophila dawsoni =

Scientific classification
- Kingdom: Animalia
- Phylum: Mollusca
- Class: Gastropoda
- Subclass: Vetigastropoda
- Order: Trochida
- Superfamily: Trochoidea
- Family: Solariellidae
- Genus: Bathymophila
- Species: B. dawsoni

Binomial name
- Bathymophila dawsoni (B. A. Marshall, 1979)

Synonyms
- Archiminolia dawsoni (B. A. Marshall, 1979) (superseded combination); Microgaza dawsoni (Marshall, 1979); Solariella (Microgaza) dawsoni Marshall, 1979

Species of gastropod

Bathymophila dawsoni is a species of sea snail, a marine gastropod mollusk in the family Solariellidae.

== Distribution ==
This marine species is endemic to New Zealand and occurs off the Kermadec Islands.
