= Bathymophila alabida =

Scientific classification
- Kingdom: Animalia
- Phylum: Mollusca
- Class: Gastropoda
- Subclass: Vetigastropoda
- Order: Trochida
- Superfamily: Trochoidea
- Family: Solariellidae
- Genus: Bathymophila
- Species: B. alabida

Binomial name
- Bathymophila alabida (B. A. Marshall, 1979)

Synonyms
- Archiminolia alabida (B. A. Marshall, 1979); Microgaza alabida (Marshall, 1979); Solariella (Microgaza) alabida Marshall, 1979 original description

Species of gastropod

Bathymophila alabida is a species of sea snail, a marine gastropod mollusk in the family Solariellidae.

== Description ==
The length of the shell attains 12 mm (0.5 in).

== Distribution ==
This marine species occurs off New Zealand (off the Three Kings Rise and the Kermadec Ridge) and New Caledonia.
