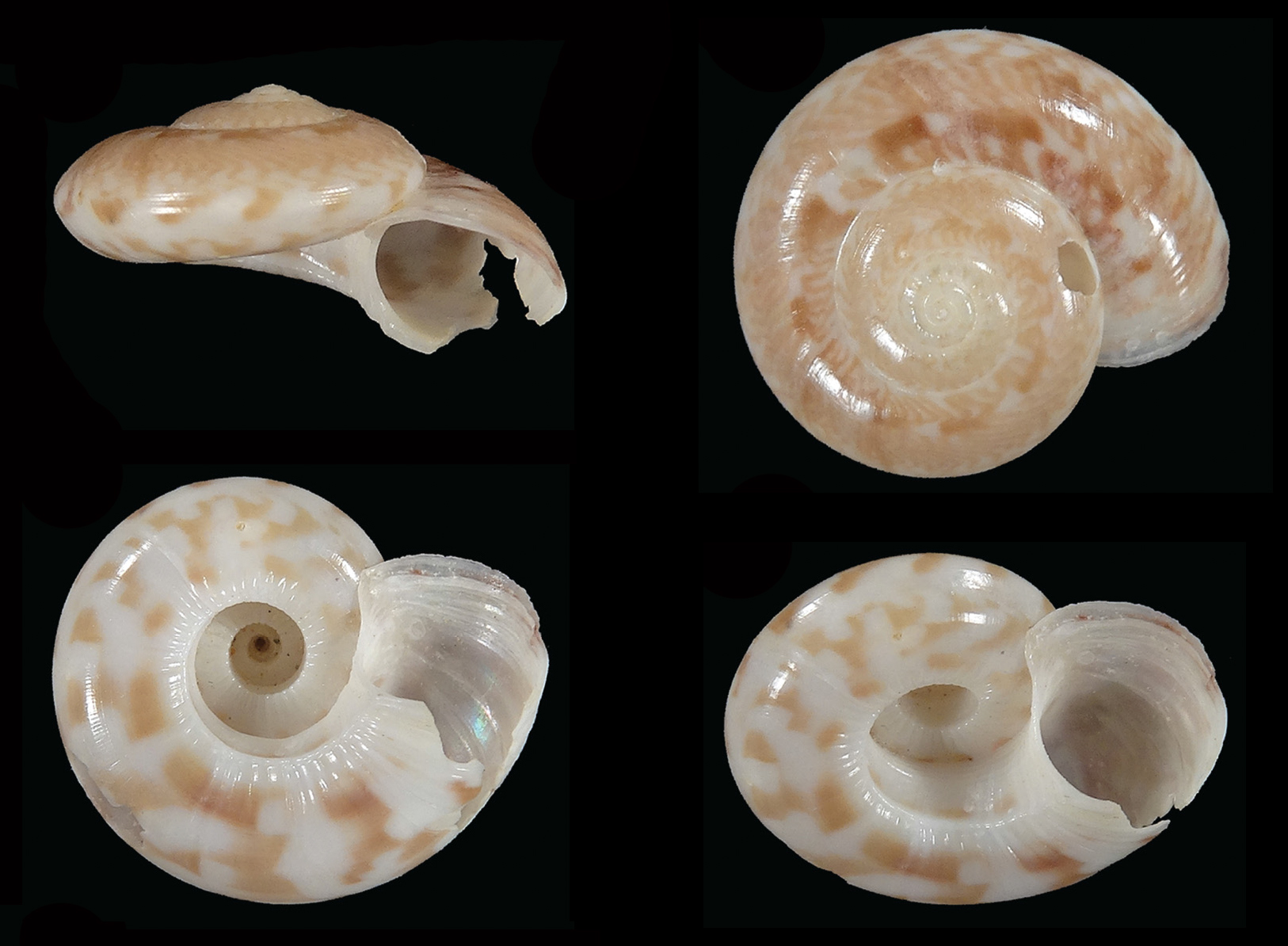
- Shell of Ilanga euryomphalos (holotype at MNHN, Paris)

Scientific classification
- Kingdom: Animalia
- Phylum: Mollusca
- Class: Gastropoda
- Subclass: Vetigastropoda
- Order: Trochida
- Family: Solariellidae
- Genus: Ilanga; Herbert, 1987

Type species
- Ilanga laevissima Martens, E.C. von, 1881

Species
- See text

Synonyms
- Machaeroplax Friele, 1877

= Ilanga =

Genus of gastropods

Ilanga is a genus of sea snails, marine gastropod mollusks in the family Solariellidae.

== Species ==
Species within the genus Ilanga include:

- Ilanga agulhaensis (Thiele, 1925)
- Ilanga aquamarina (Melvill, 1909)
- Ilanga bicarinata (A. Adams & Reeve, 1850)
- Ilanga biradiatula (Martens, 1902)
- Ilanga boreia Vilvens & S. T. Williams, 2020
- Ilanga comes Vilvens & S. T. Williams, 2020
- Ilanga corrineae Vilvens & S. T. Williams, 2020
- Ilanga cosmia Vilvens & S. T. Williams, 2020
- Ilanga discus Herbert, 1987
- Ilanga dongshaensis Vilvens & S. T. Williams, 2020
- Ilanga euryomphalos Vilvens & S. T. Williams, 2020
- Ilanga eurystoma Vilvens & S. T. Williams, 2020
- Ilanga fulgens (Dall, 1907)
- Ilanga furtiva Herbert, 1987
- Ilanga gotoi (Poppe, Tagaro & Dekker, 2006)
- Ilanga gratiosa (Thiele, 1925)
- Ilanga harrytaylori Vilvens & S. T. Williams, 2020
- Ilanga helicoides Vilvens & S. T. Williams, 2020
- Ilanga herberti Vilvens & S. T. Williams, 2020
- Ilanga humillima (Thiele, 1925)
- Ilanga illustris (Sturany, 1904)
- Ilanga impolita Herbert, 1987
- Ilanga incisura (Melvill, 1909)
- Ilanga kilburni Herbert, 1987
- Ilanga konos (Vilvens, 2009)
- Ilanga laevissima (Martens, 1881)
- Ilanga lauensis Vilvens & S. T. Williams, 2020
- Ilanga lirellata Herbert, 1987
- Ilanga maculicincta Herbert, 1987
- Ilanga mesembrine Vilvens & S. T. Williams, 2020
- Ilanga millardi Herbert, 1987
- Ilanga navakaensis (Ladd, 1982)
- Ilanga norfolkensis (B. A. Marshall, 1999)
- Ilanga oxeia Vilvens & S. T. Williams, 2020
- Ilanga philia Vilvens & S. T. Williams, 2020
- Ilanga platypeza Herbert, 1987
- Ilanga polita Herbert, 1987
- Ilanga polygramma Vilvens & S. T. Williams, 2020
- Ilanga rhyssomphala Herbert, 1987
- Ilanga stephanophora Vilvens & S. T. Williams, 2020
- Ilanga whitechurchi (Turton, 1932)

Species brought into synonymy

- Ilanga carinata Verrill, A.E., 1882: synonym of Solariella obscura (Couthouy, J.P., 1838)
- Ilanga nyssonoides "Kuroda, T. MS" Okutani, T.A., 1964 (nomen nudum): synonym of Solariella tenuicollaris Golikov, A.N. & B.I. Sirenko, 1998
- Ilanga planula Verrill, A.E., 1882: synonym of Solariella obscura (Couthouy, J.P., 1838)
- Ilanga undata (G.B. Sowerby, 1870): synonym of Ilanga bicarinata bicarinata (A. Adams & Reeve, 1850)

== Notes ==
- Herbert, D.G. (1987). Revision of the Solariellinae (Mollusca: Prosobranchia: Trochidae) in southern Africa. Annals of the Natal Museum, 28(2): 283–382.
- S. Williams: Ilanga
