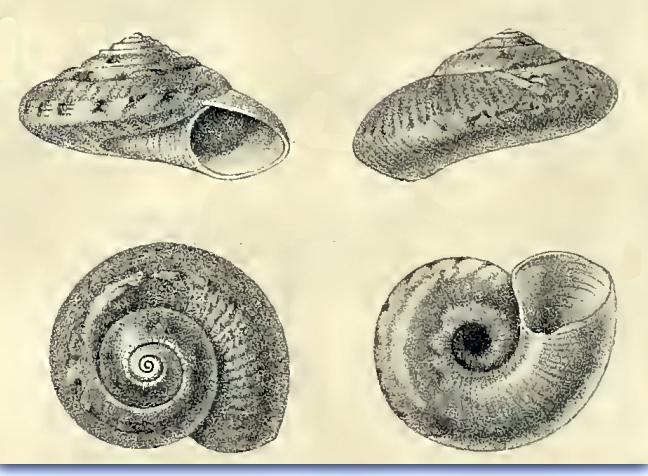
- Drawing with four views of a shell of Ilanga fulgens

Scientific classification
- Kingdom: Animalia
- Phylum: Mollusca
- Class: Gastropoda
- Subclass: Vetigastropoda
- Order: Trochida
- Superfamily: Trochoidea
- Family: Solariellidae
- Genus: Ilanga
- Species: I. fulgens

Binomial name
- Ilanga fulgens (Dall, 1907)

Synonyms
- Archiminolia fulgens (Dall, 1907); Archiminolia zacalloides (Schepman, 1908); Ilanga konos (Vilvens, 2009); Microgaza fulgens Dall, 1907; Microgaza konos Vilvens, 2009 (original combination); Solariella (Solariella) zacalloides Schepman, 1908

= Ilanga fulgens =

Species of gastropod

Ilanga fulgens is a species of sea snail, a marine gastropod mollusk in the family Solariellidae.

== Description ==
(Original description by M. Schepman) The size of the shell varies between 5 mm and 12 mm. The shell has a depressed, slightly conical shape. It is rather thin. The upper surface is yellowish-white, with ziczac-lines and blotches of yellowish-brown, forming more or less distinct bands, of which one, consisting of triangular white spots and very small blotches, borders the suture. A peripheral band is distinctly articulated with white and brown and an intermediate band of more arrow-headed blotches. The interstices are filled by the yellowish-brown lines, which are often confluent, leaving only small whitish spots. The basal surface is lighter, with scarce markings, of which a band of blotches, bordering the umbilicus, is the most conspicuous.

The shell contains about five whorls. The nucleus is smooth. The next two whorls contain a few (3 or 4) lirae, which are slightly irregular, the upper one is beaded. The lirae become less distinct, being broader and flatter on the next whorl, and are transferred in distant striae with smooth interstices. The infrasutural beads, cease on the penultimate whorl. Besides this sculpture, the whole shell has a smooth, shining appearance, with very fine lines of growth. The body whorl has only a few spiral striae near the periphery. The whorls are slightly convex, the last one is a little depressed and much enlarged, but has no keel. The basal surface is smooth, with fine lines of growth and short, radiating striae round the umbilicus, which is large, pervious, funnel-shaped, sculptured with lines of growth and about 9 spiral lirae. The aperture is subcircular, slightly angular above and compressed near the periphery. The outer margin is thin. The columellar margin is sinuous, thickened, slightly reflected above, running without appreciable angle into the basal margin. The interior of the aperture is nacreous.

== Distribution ==
This marine species occurs in the East China Sea, off Japan, the Philippines, and Australia.
