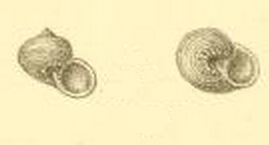
- Minolia rotundata shell

Scientific classification
- Kingdom: Animalia
- Phylum: Mollusca
- Class: Gastropoda
- Subclass: Vetigastropoda
- Order: Trochida
- Family: Solariellidae
- Genus: Minolia; A. Adams, 1860

Type species
- Minolia punctata Adams, A., 1860

Synonyms
- Hazuregyra Shikama, 1962 ·(junior subjective synonym); Margarita (Minolia) A. Adams, 1860; Minolia (Machaeroplax) Friele, 1877; Minolia (Minolia) A. Adams, 1860; Minosia [sic] misspelling - incorrect subsequent spelling; Monilea (Minolia) A. Adams, 1860 superseded ran; Solariella (Minolia) A. Adams, 1860; Trochus (Minolia) A. Adams, 1860

= Minolia =

Genus of gastropods

Minolia is a genus of sea snails, marine gastropod mollusks in the family Solariellidae.

A. Adams named the genus from Mino-Sima, the little island near Niphon (Japan). Minolia was in older textbooks regarded as a subgenus of Margarita Leach, 1819 (itself now a synonym of Margarites Gray, 1847).

== Description ==
The thin, delicate, smooth shell is depressed and widely umbilicated. The whorls are rounded or angulated. The spire is depressed. The sculpture is finely decussated. The aperture is circular. The outer lip and columella thin, simple, acute. The umbilicus is simple and contains no spiral, callous internal funicle or rib.

== Distribution ==
These marine species belong to the Indian Ocean, the western and southwestern Pacific Ocean.

== Species ==
Species within the genus Minolia include:

- Minolia casta (G. Nevill & H. Nevill, 1874)
- Minolia chishiungi S.-I Huang, H.-Y. Kao, I-F. Fu, M.-H. Lin & K.-H. Jang, 2025
- Minolia gemyu S.-I Huang, H.-Y. Kao, I-F. Fu, M.-H. Lin & K.-H. Jang, 2025
- Minolia kelan S.-I Huang, H.-Y. Kao, I-F. Fu, M.-H. Lin & K.-H. Jang, 2025
- Minolia midwayensis Shikama, 1977
- Minolia nanfangao S.-I Huang, H.-Y. Kao, I-F. Fu, M.-H. Lin & K.-H. Jang, 2025
- Minolia nyssonus (Dall, 1919)
- † Minolia ovriensis Oleinik, 1991
- Minolia peramabilis Carpenter, 1864
- † Minolia perglobosa (Ludbrook, 1941)
- Minolia pompiliodes Melvill, 1891 (uncertain > unassessed, use in recent literature not established by editor)
- Minolia pseudobscura (Yokoyama, 1927):
- Minolia punctata A. Adams, 1860
- Minolia rotundata (Sowerby III, 1894) (taxon inquirendum)
- Minolia sakya Nomura, 1940 (taxon inquirendum)
- Minolia shimajiriensis (MacNeil, 1960)
- Minolia shundei S.-I Huang, H.-Y. Kao, I-F. Fu, M.-H. Lin & K.-H. Jang, 2025
- Minolia stronyle Vilvens, 2022
- Minolia watanabei (Shikama, 1962)

Taxa inquirenda

- Minolia caifassii Carmagna, 1888:
- Minolia ceraunia Melvill, 1891
- Minolia chinensis Sowerby, 1888 (use in recent literature currently undocumented)
- Minolia condei Poppe, Tagaro & Dekker, 2006
- Minolia edithae Melvill, 1891
- Minolia gilvosplendens Melvill, 1891
- Minolia malcolmia Melvill, 1891

Species mentioned in the Indo-Pacific Molluscan Database

- Minolia eilikrines Melvill, 1891 (incertae sedis)

== Synonyms ==
- Subgenus Minolia (Conotrochus) Pilsbry, 1889 represented as Conotrochus Seguenza, 1864 (alternate representation)
- Minolia adarticulata Barnard, 1963: synonym of Spectamen adarticulatum (Barnard, 1963)
- Minolia agapeta Melvill & Standen, 1896: synonym of Parminolia agapeta (Melvill & Standen, 1896)
- Minolia amblia Dall, 1927; synonym of Tegula patagonica (d'Orbigny, 1835)
- Minolia arata Hedley, 1903: synonym of Minolops arata Hedley, 1903
- Minolia articulata (Gould, 1861): synonym of Pseudominolia articulata (Gould, 1861)
- Minolia bellula Angas, 1869: synonym of Spectamen bellulum (Angas, 1869)
- Minolia biangulosa (A. Adams, 1854): synonym of Pseudominolia biangulosa (A. Adams, 1854)
- Minolia bicarinata (A. Adams & Reeve, 1850): synonym of Ilanga bicarinata (A. Adams & Reeve, 1850)
- Minolia bleeki (Gould, 1861): synonym of Pseudominolia articulata (Gould, 1861)
- Minolia charmosyne Melvill, 1918: synonym of Pseudominolia musiva (Gould, 1861)
- Minolia cincta (Cotton & Godfrey, 1938): synonym of Minolops cincta (Cotton & Godfrey, 1938)
- Minolia cinerea Preston, 1909: synonym of Minolops cinerea (Preston, 1909)
- Minolia climacota Melvill, 1897: synonym of Pseudominolia climacota (Melvill, 1897)
- Minolia congener G.B. Sowerby, 1903: synonym of Ilanga laevissima (Martens, 1881)
- Minolia dulcis E. A. Smith, 1907: synonym of Antimargarita dulcis (E. A. Smith, 1907)
- Minolia eucoronata G.B. Sowerby III, 1905: synonym of Ethminolia impressa (G. Nevill & H. Nevill, 1869)
- Minolia eudeli Deshayes, 1863: synonym of Ethminolia eudeli (Deshayes, 1863) (superseded combination)
- Minolia eutyches Melvill, 1918: synonym of Pagodatrochus variabilis (H. Adams, 1873)
- Minolia gemmulata Kuroda & Habe in Kuroda et al., 1971: synonym of Minolia shimajiriensis (MacNeil, 1960) (junior synonym)
- Minolia gertruda Iredale, 1936: synonym of Minolops gertruda Iredale, 1936
- Minolia glaphyrella Melvill & Standen, 1895: synonym of Ethminolia glaphyrella (Melvill & Standen, 1895)
- Minolia glaucophaos (Barnard, 1963): synonym of Falsimargarita glaucophaos (Barnard, 1963)
- Minolia gradata G.B. Sowerby III, 1895: synonym of Pseudominolia gradata (G. B. Sowerby III, 1895)
- Minolia henniana Melvill, 1891: synonym of Conotalopia henniana (Melvill, 1891)
- Minolia hilarula Yokoyama, 1926: synonym of Conotalopia hilarula (Yokoyama, 1926)
- Minolia holdsworthana (G. Nevill & H. Nevill, 1871): synonym of Pseudominolia musiva (Gould, 1861)
- Minolia holdsworthiana H. Nevill & G. Nevill, 1871: synonym of Isanda holdsworthana (H. Nevill & G. Nevill, 1871)
- Minolia impressa (G. Nevill & H. Nevill, 1869): synonym of Ethminolia impressa (G. Nevill & H. Nevill, 1869)
- Minolia laevissima (Martens, 1881): synonym of Ilanga laevissima (Martens, 1881)
- Minolia lentiginosa (Adams, A., 1853): synonym of Monilea lentiginosa (A. Adams, 1853)
- Minolia minima Golikov, in Golikov & Scarlato, 1967: synonym of Conotalopia minima (Golikov, 1967)
- Minolia nedyma Melvill, 1897: synonym of Pseudominolia nedyma (Melvill, 1897)
- Minolia ornata G. B. Sowerby III, 1903: synonym of Conotalopia ornata (G. B. Sowerby III, 1903)
- Minolia ornatissima Schepman, 1908: synonym of Solariella ornatissima (Schepman, 1908)
- Minolia pantanelli (Caramagna, 1888): synonym of Monilea pantanellii (Caramagna, 1888)
- Minolia pardalis Herbert, 1987: synonym of Spectamen pardalis Herbert, 1987
- Minolia peramabilis Carpenter, 1864: synonym of Solariella peramabilis Carpenter, 1864
- Minolia philippensis Watson, 1880: synonym of Solariella philippensis (Watson, 1880)
- Minolia plicatula Murdoch & Suter, 1906: synonym of Solariella plicatula (Murdoch & Suter, 1906)
- Minolia pulcherrima Angas, 1869: synonym of Minolops pulcherrima (Angas, 1869)
- Minolia pulcherrima emendata Iredale, 1924: synonym of Minolops emendata (Iredale, 1924)
- Minolia sculpta (G.B. Sowerby, 1897): synonym of Ethminolia sculpta (G.B. Sowerby, 1897)
- Minolia segersi Poppe, Tagaro & Dekker, 2006: synonym of Solariella segersi (Poppe, Tagaro & Dekker, 2006)
- Minolia sematensis Oyama, 1942: synonym of Conotalopia sematensis (Oyama, 1942)
- Minolia semireticulata (Suter, 1908): synonym of Spectamen semireticulatum (Suter, 1908)
- Minolia singaporensis (Pilsbry, 1889): synonym of Conotalopia singaporensis (Pilsbry, 1889)
- Minolia splendens (G. B. Sowerby, 1897): synonym of Pseudominolia splendens (Sowerby III, 1897)
- Minolia stearnsii Pilsbry, 1895: synonym of Sericominolia stearnsii (Pilsbry, 1895)
- Minolia strigata (G.B. Sowerby III, 1894): synonym of Conotalopia musiva (A. A. Gould, 1861) (junior subjective synonym)
- Minolia subangulata Kuroda & Habe, 1952: synonym of Minolia punctata A. Adams, 1860 (junior subjective synonym)
- Minolia subplicata Nevill: synonym of Vaceuchelus clathratus (A. Adams, 1853)
- Minolia tabakotanii Poppe, Tagaro & Dekker, 2006: synonym of Zetela tabakotanii (Poppe, Tagaro & Dekker, 2006) (original combination)
- Minolia tasmanica Tenison-Woods, 1876: synonym of Ethminolia vitiliginea (Menke, 1843)
- Minolia textilis Murdoch & Suter, 1906: synonym of Zetela textilis (Murdoch & Suter, 1906)
- Minolia thielei Hedley, 1916: synonym of Falsimargarita thielei (Hedley, 1916)
- Minolia undata (G.B. Sowerby, 1870): synonym of Ilanga undata undata (G.B. Sowerby, 1870)
- Minolia variabilis H. Adams, 1873: synonym of Pagodatrochus variabilis (H. Adams, 1873)
- Minolia variegata Odhner, 1919: synonym of Pseudominolia splendens (G.B. Sowerby, 1897)
