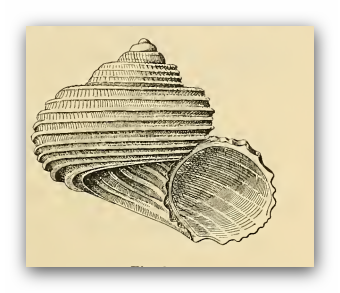
- Drawing of a shell of Spectamen aratum

Scientific classification
- Kingdom: Animalia
- Phylum: Mollusca
- Class: Gastropoda
- Subclass: Vetigastropoda
- Order: Trochida
- Superfamily: Trochoidea
- Family: Solariellidae
- Genus: Minolops; Iredale, 1929

Type species
- Minolia emendata Iredale, 1924

= Minolops =

Genus of gastropods

Minolops is a genus of sea snails, marine gastropod mollusks in the family Solariellidae within the superfamily Trochoidea, the top snails, turban snails and their allies.

B.A. Marshall (1999) thought that Minolops may be synonymous with Spectamen

== Species ==
Species within the genus Minolops include:

- Minolops arata Hedley, 1903: synonym of Spectamen aratum (Hedley, 1903) (superseded combination)
- Minolops casta (Nevill & Nevill, 1874): synonym of Minolia casta (G. Nevill & H. Nevill, 1874)
- Minolops cinerea (Preston, 1909): synonym of Spectamen cinereum (Preston, 1909) (superseded combinatio
- Minolops corallina] (Cotton & Godfrey, 1935): synonym of Spectamen corallinum (Cotton & Godfrey, 1935): synonym of Argalista corallina (Cotton & Godfrey, 1935) (superseded combination)
- Minolops gertruda Iredale, 1936: synonym of Spectamen gertruda (Iredale, 1936) (superseded combination)
- Minolops pulcherrima Angas, 1869: synonym of Spectamen pulcherrimum (Angas, 1869) (superseded combination)
- Minolops rosulenta (Watson, 1883): synonym of Minolops pulcherrimus (Angas, 1869): synonym of Spectamen pulcherrimum (Angas, 1869) (junior subjective synonym)

Species brought into synonymy

- Minolops cincta (Cotton, B.C. & F.K. Godfrey, 1938): synonym of Minolia cincta (Cotton & Godfrey, 1938)
- Minolops emendata (Iredale, 1924): synonym of Minolops pulcherrima emendata (Iredale, 1924)
