= Minolia edithae =

- Original drawing of a shell of Minolia edithae

Scientific classification
- Kingdom: Animalia
- Phylum: Mollusca
- Class: Gastropoda
- Subclass: Vetigastropoda
- Order: Trochida
- Superfamily: Trochoidea
- Family: Solariellidae
- Genus: Minolia
- Species: M. edithae

Binomial name
- Minolia edithae Melvill, 1891

Species of gastropod

Minolia edithae is a species of sea snail, a marine gastropod mollusk in the family Solariellidae.

== Description ==
The size of the shell attains 6 mm. The white shell has a subconical shape and is narrowly umbilicated. The shell contains four whorls. The aperture is ovate-triangular. The outer lip is simple. The columellar margin is reflected.

Minolia ceraunia and Minolia edithae look very much alike, but are distinguished by the following characters. Minolia edithae has the whole surface of the shell, including the base, finely concentrically lirate, whilst the base of Minolia ceraunia is smooth. That species is also very depressed, while Minolia edithae is conical in form. The disposition of markings, while the same round the whorls, has an arrangement of zigzag rufous lines, edged with white, regularly disposed, as if originating from a common axis (the apex), and towards the base becoming quite different, for, while in Minolia ceraunia a very beautiful crimson band is formed by the junction of these lines. In Minolia edithae this is absent, and the base is almost white.

== Distribution ==
The marine species occurs off the Philippines.
