= Minolops pulcherrima emendata =

Scientific classification
- Kingdom: Animalia
- Phylum: Mollusca
- Class: Gastropoda
- Subclass: Vetigastropoda
- Order: Trochida
- Superfamily: Trochoidea
- Family: Solariellidae
- Genus: Minolops
- Species: M. p. emendata

Binomial name
- Minolops pulcherrima emendata (Iredale, 1924)

Synonyms
- Minolops emendatus (Iredale, 1924) (§junior subjective synonym)

Subspecies of gastropod

Minolops pulcherrima emendata is a subspecies of sea snail, a marine gastropod mollusk in the family Solariellidae.

This is a subjective junior synonym of Minolops pulcherrimus (Angas, 1869): synonym of Spectamen pulcherrimum (Angas, 1869)

== Description ==
The height of the shell attains 2.5 mm, its diameter 5 mm. The penultimate whorl contains five prominent keels, all of equal strength.

The shell is made up of 6 whorls, the last one being tricarinate, white and rounded beneath. Its striae are fine and close-set, with the body-whorl being pinkish or yellowish white stained with bright rose.

== Distribution ==
This marine subspecies is endemic to Australia and occurs off New South Wales
