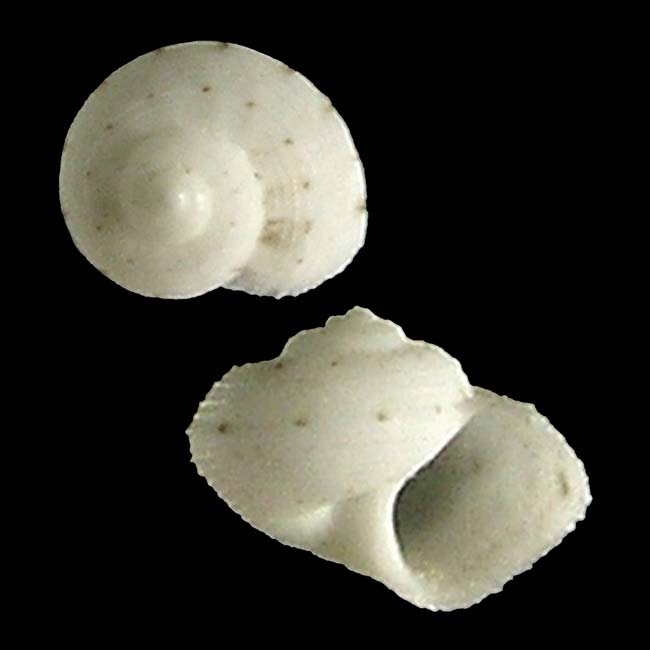

Scientific classification
- Kingdom: Animalia
- Phylum: Mollusca
- Class: Gastropoda
- Subclass: Vetigastropoda
- Order: Trochida
- Superfamily: Trochoidea
- Family: Trochidae
- Genus: Pseudominolia
- Species: P. tramieri

Binomial name
- Pseudominolia tramieri Poppe, Tagaro & Dekker, 2006

= Pseudominolia tramieri =

Species of gastropod

Pseudominolia tramieri is a species of sea snail, a marine gastropod mollusk in the family Trochidae, the top snails.

== Description ==
The size of the shell varies between 3 mm and 22 mm.

== Distribution ==
This marine species occurs off the Philippines.
