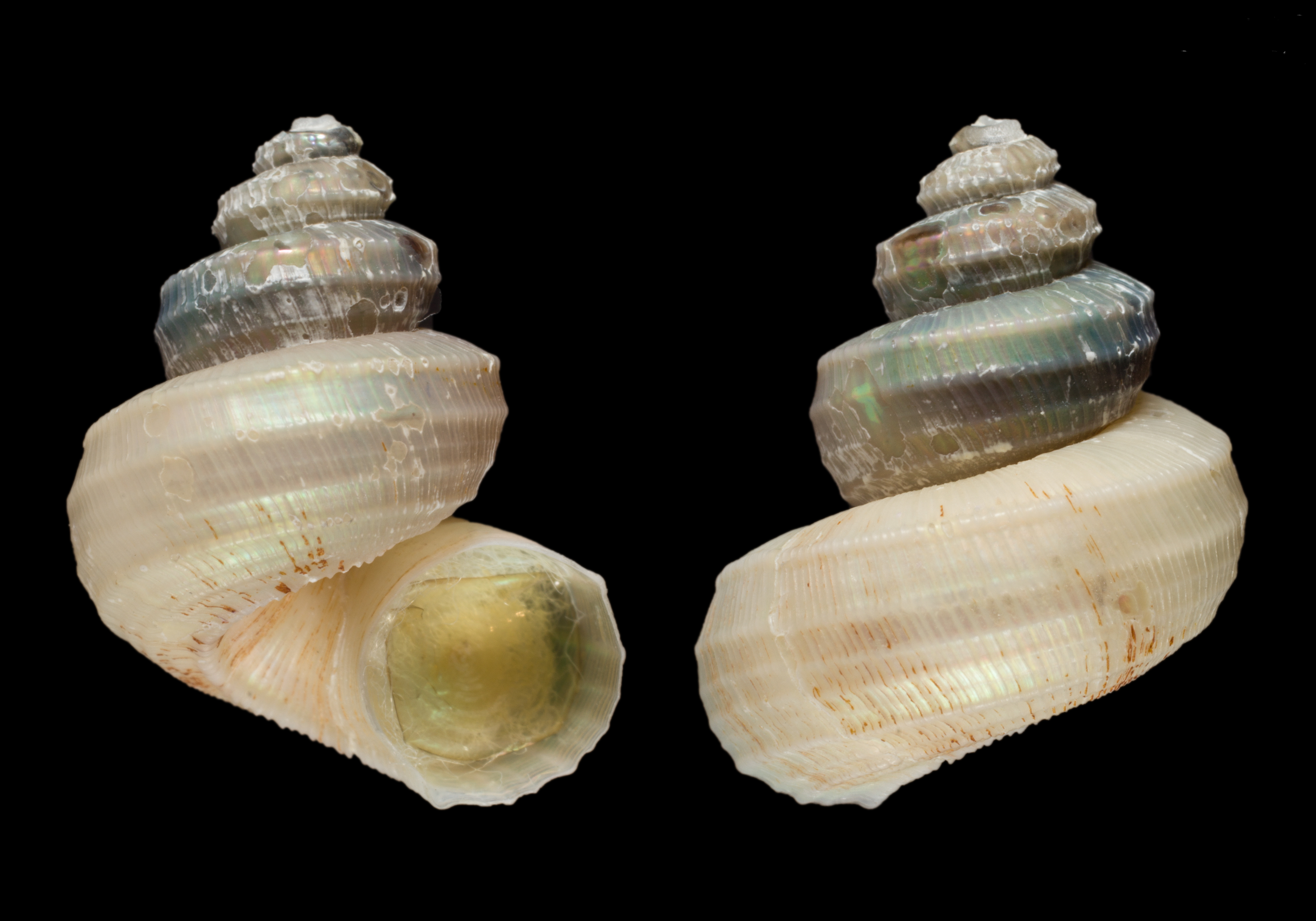
- Shell of Zetela alphonsi

Scientific classification
- Kingdom: Animalia
- Phylum: Mollusca
- Class: Gastropoda
- Subclass: Vetigastropoda
- Order: Trochida
- Family: Solariellidae
- Genus: Zetela; Finlay, 1926

Type species
- Minolia textilis Murdoch & Suter, 1906

Species
- See text

= Zetela =

Genus of gastropods

Zetela is a genus of sea snails, marine gastropod mollusks in the family Solariellidae.

== Species ==
Species within the genus Zetela include:

- Zetela alphonsi Vilvens, 2002
- Zetela annectens Marshall, 1999
- † Zetela awamoana Laws, 1939
- † Zetela castigata (Marwick, 1931)
- Zetela kopua Marshall, 1999
- † Zetela praetextilis (Suter, 1917)
- Zetela semisculpta (E. von Martens, 1904)
- Zetela tabakotanii (Poppe, Tagaro & Dekker, 2006)
- Zetela tangaroa Marshall, 1999
- Zetela textilis (Murdoch & Suter, 1906)
- Zetela turbynei (Barnard, 1963)
- Zetela variabilis Dell, 1956
- Zetela williamsae Vilvens, 2022

=== Species brought into synonymy ===
- Zetela dedonderorum Poppe, Tagaro & Dekker, 2006: synonym of Solariella dedonderorum (Poppe, Tagaro & Dekker, 2006)
- † Zetela hutchinsoniana Laws, 1939: synonym of † Calliotropis hutchinsoniana (Laws, 1939) (original combination)
- † Zetela parvumbilicata Laws, 1939: synonym of † Herpetopoma parvumbilicatum (Laws, 1939) (superseded combination)
