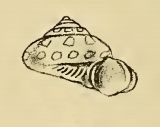
- Original drawing of a shell of Minolia pompiliodes

Scientific classification
- Kingdom: Animalia
- Phylum: Mollusca
- Class: Gastropoda
- Subclass: Vetigastropoda
- Order: Trochida
- Superfamily: Trochoidea
- Family: Solariellidae
- Genus: Minolia
- Species: M. pompiliodes

Binomial name
- Minolia pompiliodes Melvill, 1891

= Minolia pompiliodes =

Species of gastropod

Minolia pompiliodes is a species of sea snail, a marine gastropod mollusk in the family Solariellidae.

== Description ==
The height of the shell attains 6 mm, its diameter 9 mm. The shell has a conical and depressed shape. It has five whorls. The outer lip is thin. The columellar margin is reflected at the angle near the umbilicus.

This is a most beautiful species, smooth, shining, ornamented with a beautiful regular series of white spots upon a bright fawn-coloured ground. At the periphery, which is not angled, the shell is whitish, with another line of zigzagged pale-brown markings more flame-shaped at the base. Around the deep umbilicus, the margin of which is very slightly angled, a row of dark-brown flames alternates with the white. The interior of the almost round aperture is smooth and beautifully margaritaceous.

== Distribution ==
The marine species occurs off the Philippines.
