= Minolops cincta =

Scientific classification
- Kingdom: Animalia
- Phylum: Mollusca
- Class: Gastropoda
- Subclass: Vetigastropoda
- Order: Trochida
- Superfamily: Trochoidea
- Family: Solariellidae
- Genus: Minolops
- Species: M. cincta

Binomial name
- Minolops cincta (Cotton & Godfrey, 1938)

Synonyms
- Ethminolia cincta Cotton & Godfrey, 1938 (original combination); Minolia cincta (Cotton & Godfrey, 1938)

Species of gastropod

Minolops cincta is a species of sea snail, a marine gastropod mollusk in the family Solariellidae.

== Description ==
The size of the shell attains 6 mm.

== Distribution ==
This marine species occurs off South Australia.
