= Minolia peramabilis =

- Drawing with two views of a shell of Minolia peramabilis

Scientific classification
- Kingdom: Animalia
- Phylum: Mollusca
- Class: Gastropoda
- Subclass: Vetigastropoda
- Order: Trochida
- Superfamily: Trochoidea
- Family: Solariellidae
- Genus: Minolia
- Species: M. peramabilis

Binomial name
- Minolia peramabilis Carpenter, 1864

Synonyms
- Solariella peramabilis Carpenter, 1864; Solariella rhyssa Dall, 1919

Species of gastropod

Minolia peramabilis, common name the lovely Pacific margarite, is a species of sea snail, a marine gastropod mollusk in the family Solariellidae.

== Description ==
The height of the shell attains 8 mm, its diameter is 8 mm. The very thinshell is very elegantly sculptured. It is livid, spotted with pale rufous-brown. The protoconch consists of 2 whorls, very tumid and smooth. The apex is mammillated. The teleoconch consists of 4 whorls. These are tabulated, with their sutures nearly rectangular. Upon the spire there are two or three carinae, and intercalated carinulae. The entire surface is most elegantly and densely radiately costate. The costae are very acute, subgranulose upon the carinae. The interstices on the first whorl are fenestrated, posteriorly decussated. The base of the shell is deeply rounded. The shell is sculptured with about 5 lirulae, anteriorly granulose. The umbilicus is large, closely ornamented with about 3 spiral distant lines, and radiating costulations continued from the base. The umbilicus is bounded by a granular keel, but has three other distant spiral lines crossing the lirulae. The rounded aperture is indentated by the carinae, scarcely in contact parietally, iridescent inside and nacreous. The operculum is very thin, multispiral, with about 10 elegantly rugulose whorls. The aperture is sculptured with delicate waved radiating lines.

== Distribution ==
This marine species occurs off Alaska and western Canada.
