= Ethminolia elveri =

Scientific classification
- Kingdom: Animalia
- Phylum: Mollusca
- Class: Gastropoda
- Subclass: Vetigastropoda
- Order: Trochida
- Superfamily: Trochoidea
- Family: Trochidae
- Genus: Ethminolia
- Species: E. elveri

Binomial name
- Ethminolia elveri Cotton & Godfrey, 1938

Species of gastropod

Ethminolia elveri is a species of sea snail, a marine gastropod mollusk in the family Trochidae, the top snails.

== Distribution ==
This marine species is endemic to Australia and occurs off South Australia and Western Australia
