= Minolia sakya =

Scientific classification
- Kingdom: Animalia
- Phylum: Mollusca
- Class: Gastropoda
- Subclass: Vetigastropoda
- Order: Trochida
- Superfamily: Trochoidea
- Family: Solariellidae
- Genus: Minolia
- Species: M. sakya

Binomial name
- Minolia sakya Nomura, 1940

Species of gastropod

Minolia sakya is a species of sea snail, a marine gastropod mollusk in the family Solariellidae.

== Distribution ==
This marine species occurs off Japan.
