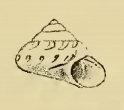
- Original drawing of a shell of Minolia malcolmia

Scientific classification
- Kingdom: Animalia
- Phylum: Mollusca
- Class: Gastropoda
- Subclass: Vetigastropoda
- Order: Trochida
- Superfamily: Trochoidea
- Family: Solariellidae
- Genus: Minolia
- Species: M. malcolmia

Binomial name
- Minolia malcolmia Melvill, 1891

= Minolia malcolmia =

Species of gastropod

Minolia malcolmia is a species of sea snail, a marine gastropod mollusk in the family Solariellidae.

== Description ==
The height of the shell attains 3.5 mm, its diameter 6 mm. The solid shell has a depressed conical shape. It is narrowly umbilicated. The shell contains 4½ whorls. The small aperture has an ovate-triangular shape. The columellar margin has a slight callus. This is a small, subconical, solid species, not so shining as some of its allies. It has red-brown speckled markings. It has no angle at the periphery. It is slightly depressed and crenulated at the sutures.

== Distribution ==
The marine species occurs off the Philippines.
