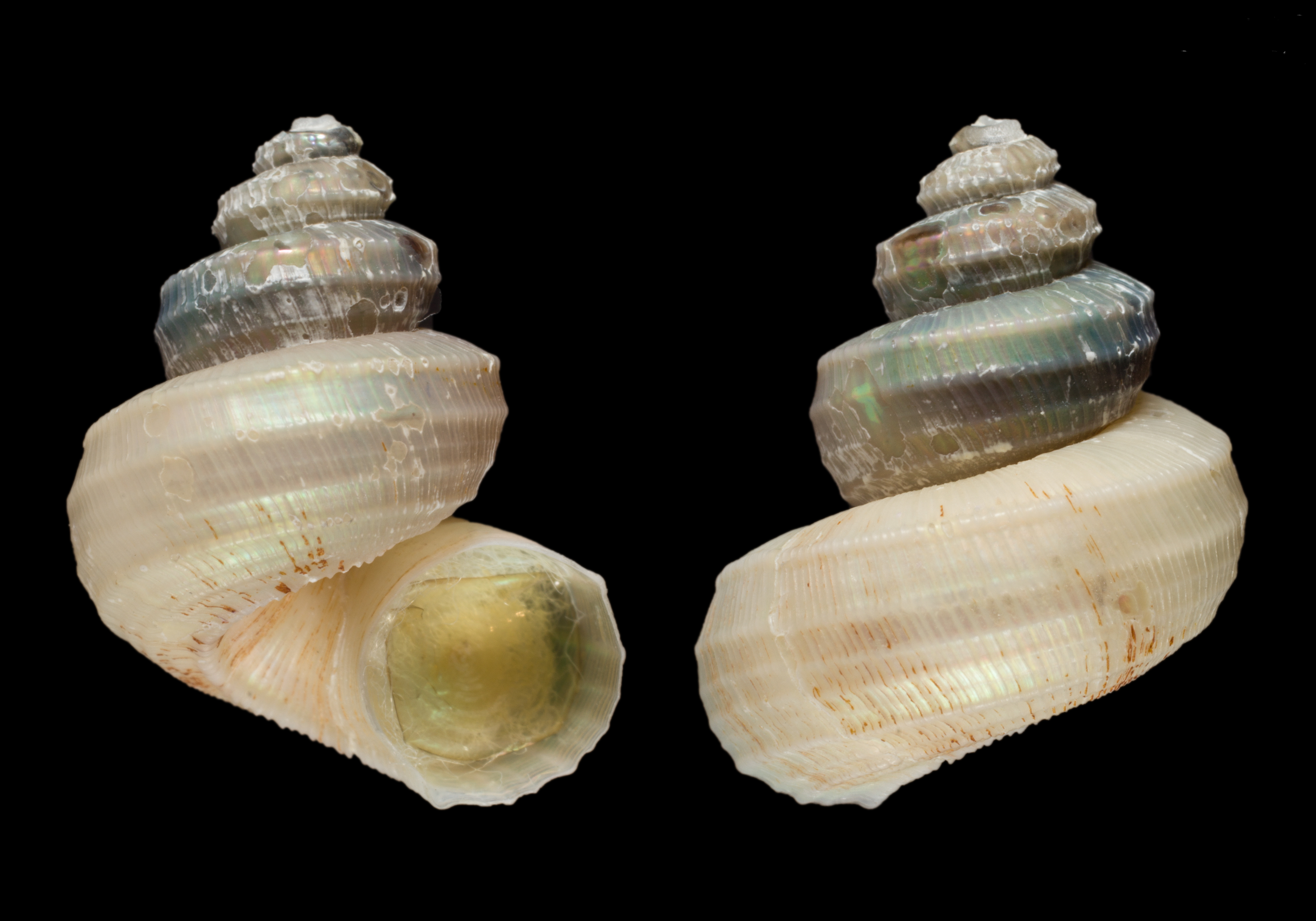
- Shell of Zetela alphonsi (holotype in MNHN, Paris)

Scientific classification
- Kingdom: Animalia
- Phylum: Mollusca
- Class: Gastropoda
- Subclass: Vetigastropoda
- Order: Trochida
- Superfamily: Trochoidea
- Family: Solariellidae
- Genus: Zetela
- Species: Z. alphonsi

Binomial name
- Zetela alphonsi Vilvens, 2002

= Zetela alphonsi =

Species of gastropod

Zetela alphonsi is a species of sea snail, a marine gastropod mollusk in the family Solariellidae, the top snails.

== Description ==
The size of the shell attains 16 mm. Zetela alphonsi also lacks retinal screening pigment, giving the appearance of eyelessness from gross examination.

== Distribution ==
This species occurs in the Pacific Ocean off Chiloé, Chile.
