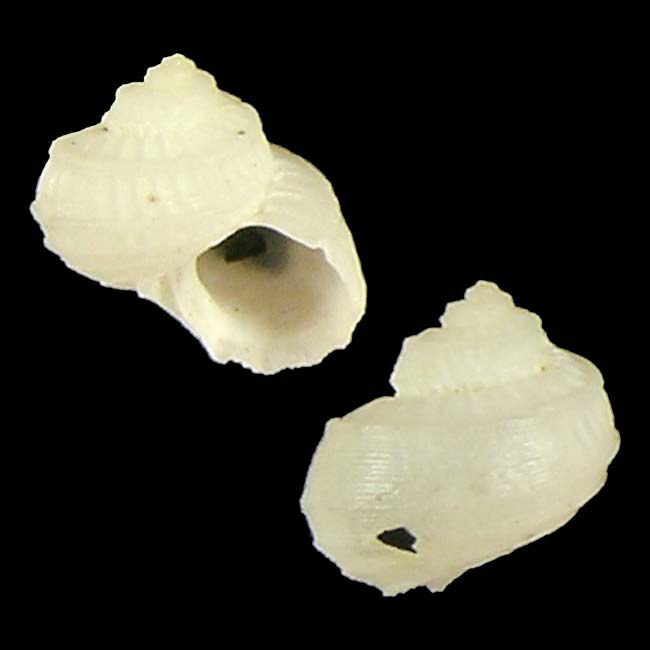

Scientific classification
- Kingdom: Animalia
- Phylum: Mollusca
- Class: Gastropoda
- Subclass: Vetigastropoda
- Order: Trochida
- Superfamily: Trochoidea
- Family: Solariellidae
- Genus: Minolia
- Species: M. condei

Binomial name
- Minolia condei Poppe, Tagaro & Dekker, 2006

= Minolia condei =

Species of gastropod

Minolia condei is a species of sea snail, a marine gastropod mollusk in the family Solariellidae.

== Description ==
The size of the shell varies between 3 mm and 5 mm.

== Distribution ==
This marine species occurs off the Philippines.
