= Ethminolia akuana =

Scientific classification
- Kingdom: Animalia
- Phylum: Mollusca
- Class: Gastropoda
- Subclass: Vetigastropoda
- Order: Trochida
- Superfamily: Trochoidea
- Family: Trochidae
- Genus: Ethminolia
- Species: E. akuana

Binomial name
- Ethminolia akuana Raines, 2007

Species of gastropod

Ethminolia akuana is a species of sea snail, a marine gastropod mollusk in the family Trochidae, the top snails.

== Description ==
The size of the shell attains 6 mm (0.24 in).

== Distribution ==
This marine species occurs off Easter Island.
