= Zetela turbynei =

Scientific classification
- Kingdom: Animalia
- Phylum: Mollusca
- Class: Gastropoda
- Subclass: Vetigastropoda
- Order: Trochida
- Superfamily: Trochoidea
- Family: Solariellidae
- Genus: Zetela
- Species: Z. turbynei

Binomial name
- Zetela turbynei (Barnard, 1963)

Synonyms
- Solariella turbynei Barnard, 1963; Solariella (Solariella) turbynei Herbert, 1987; Spectamen turbynei (Barnard, 1963)

Species of gastropod

Zetela turbynei is a species of sea snail, a marine gastropod mollusk, in the family Solariellidae.

== Description ==
The size of the shell attains 6 mm.

== Distribution ==
This marine species occurs off the Agulhas Bank, Rep. South Africa.
