= Minolia midwayensis =

Scientific classification
- Kingdom: Animalia
- Phylum: Mollusca
- Class: Gastropoda
- Subclass: Vetigastropoda
- Order: Trochida
- Superfamily: Trochoidea
- Family: Solariellidae
- Genus: Minolia
- Species: M. midwayensis

Binomial name
- Minolia midwayensis Shikama, 1977

Species of gastropod

Minolia midwayensis is a species of sea snail, a marine gastropod mollusk, in the family Solariellidae.

== Distribution ==
This species occurs in the following locations:

- Bonin
- Midway Atoll
