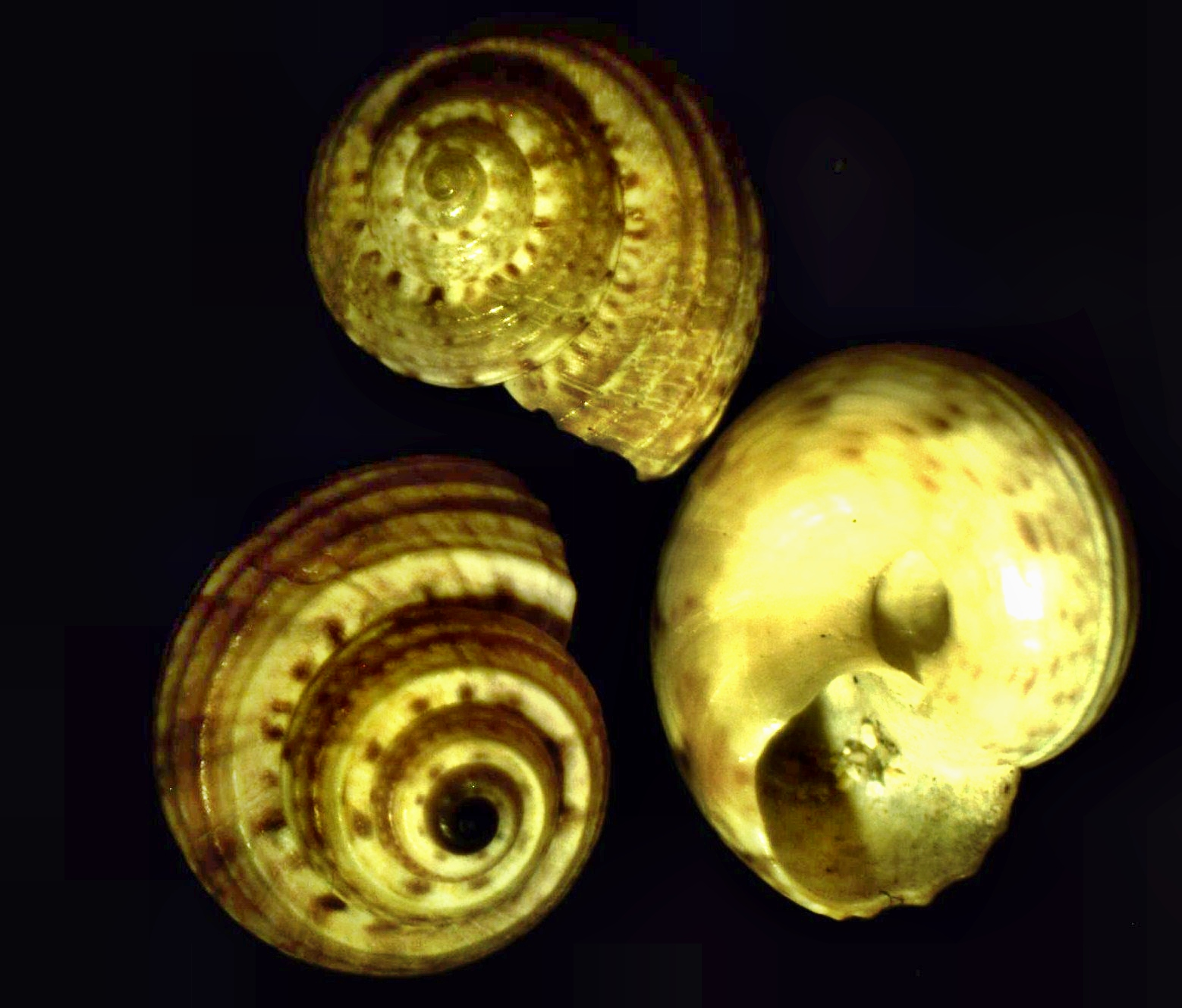
- Several views of Pseudominolia articulata

Scientific classification
- Kingdom: Animalia
- Phylum: Mollusca
- Class: Gastropoda
- Subclass: Vetigastropoda
- Order: Trochida
- Superfamily: Trochoidea
- Family: Trochidae
- Genus: Pseudominolia; Herbe, 1992

Type species
- Solariella splendens G. B. Sowerby III, 1897

= Pseudominolia =

Genus of gastropods

Pseudominolia is a genus of sea snails, marine gastropod mollusks in the subfamily Umboniinae of the family Trochidae, the top snails.

== Species ==
Species within the genus Pseudominolia include:

- Pseudominolia articulata (Gould, 1861)
- Pseudominolia biangulosa (A. Adams, 1854)
- Pseudominolia climacota (Melvill, 1897)
- Pseudominolia gradata (G. B. Sowerby III, 1895)
- Pseudominolia musiva H. Nevill & G. Nevill, 1871
- Pseudominolia nedyma (Melvill, 1897)
- Pseudominolia splendens (G.B. Sowerby, 1897)
- Pseudominolia tramieri Poppe, Tagaro & Dekker, 2006

Species brought into synonymy

- Pseudominolia musiva (Gould, 1861): synonym of Conotalopia musiva (Gould, 1861)
