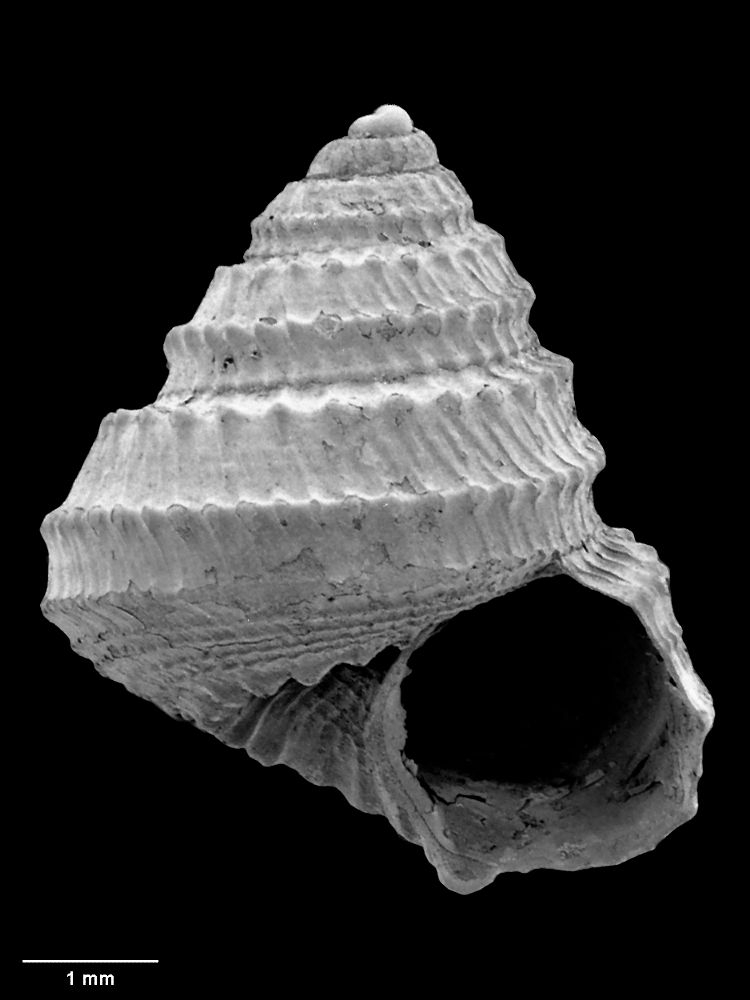
- Shell of Zetela annectens (specimen at Museum of New Zealand)

Scientific classification
- Kingdom: Animalia
- Phylum: Mollusca
- Class: Gastropoda
- Subclass: Vetigastropoda
- Order: Trochida
- Superfamily: Trochoidea
- Family: Solariellidae
- Genus: Zetela
- Species: Z. annectens

Binomial name
- Zetela annectens Marshall, 1999

= Zetela annectens =

Species of gastropod

Zetela annectens is a species of sea snail, a marine gastropod mollusk in the family Solariellidae, the top snails.

== Description ==
The length of the shell attains 5.8 mm. The shell is described as being higher than it is wide, in mature specimens, and chalky-white in colour. It resembles Lamellitrochus species, although it differs in the number of spiral cords in the base.

== Distribution ==
This marine species is endemic to New Zealand and occurs off the Great Barrier Island at depths between 486 m and 655 m.
