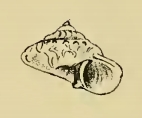
- Original drawing of a shell of Minolia gilvosplendens

Scientific classification
- Kingdom: Animalia
- Phylum: Mollusca
- Class: Gastropoda
- Subclass: Vetigastropoda
- Order: Trochida
- Superfamily: Trochoidea
- Family: Solariellidae
- Genus: Minolia
- Species: M. gilvosplendens

Binomial name
- Minolia gilvosplendens Melvill, 1891

Synonyms
- Solariella gilvosplendens Melvill, 1891

= Minolia gilvosplendens =

Species of gastropod

Minolia gilvosplendens is a species of sea snail, a marine gastropod mollusk in the family Solariellidae.

== Description ==
The height of the shell attains 6.5 mm, its diameter 8 mm. The shining, pale-white shell has a conical shape and is deeply umbilicated. The shell contains five whorls. The aperture is linear. The columellar margin is briefly reflected at the corner.

The whorls are smooth, channelled at the sutures, ornamented just below them with a row of raised coronated nodules, less distinct on the front of the basal whorl – this materially aids in giving the shell a slightly angled appearance. It is white, with many flame-like markings. The umbilicus is deep and very slightly contracted. The umbilicus itself is decorated with a transversely-channelled sculpture. Its substance is margaritaceous. The interior of the round and simple aperture is pearly and smooth.

== Distribution ==
The marine species occurs off the Philippines.
