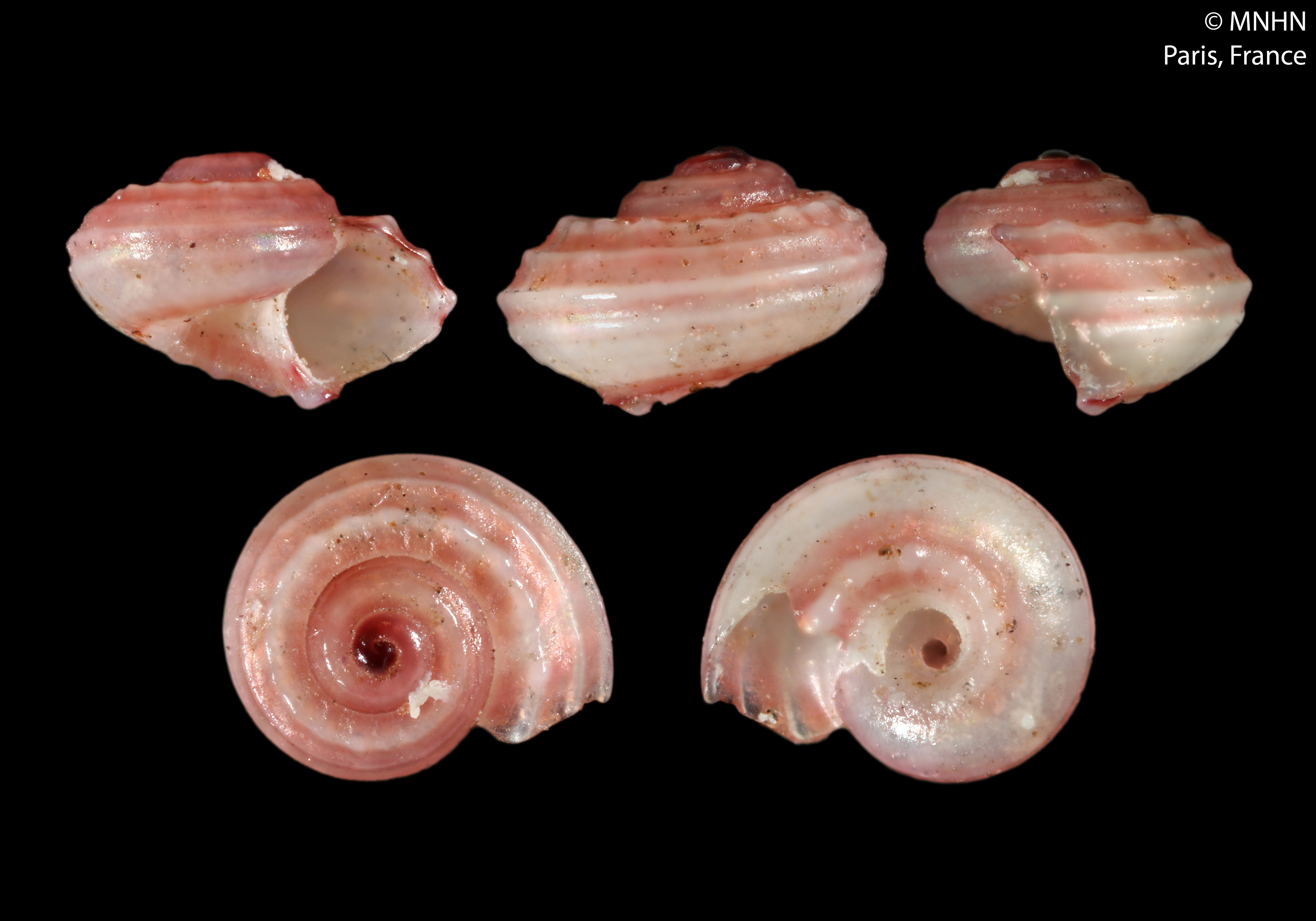
- Shell of Ethminolia gravieri (holotype at MNHN, Paris)

Scientific classification
- Kingdom: Animalia
- Phylum: Mollusca
- Class: Gastropoda
- Subclass: Vetigastropoda
- Order: Trochida
- Superfamily: Trochoidea
- Family: Trochidae
- Genus: Ethminolia
- Species: E. gravieri

Binomial name
- Ethminolia gravieri (Lamy, 1909)

Synonyms
- Cyclostrema gravieri Lamy, 1909

= Ethminolia gravieri =

Species of gastropod

Ethminolia gravieri is a species of sea snail, a marine gastropod mollusk in the family Trochidae, the top snails.

== Description ==
The size of the shell attains 1.25 mm.

== Distribution ==
This marine species occurs in the following locations:

- Off Madagascar in the Mozambique Channel.
