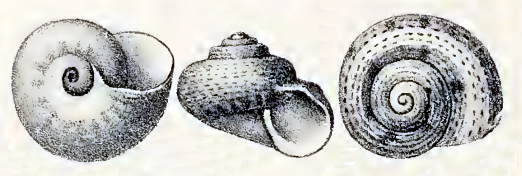
- Three views of a shell of Ethminolia degregorii

Scientific classification
- Kingdom: Animalia
- Phylum: Mollusca
- Class: Gastropoda
- Subclass: Vetigastropoda
- Order: Trochida
- Superfamily: Trochoidea
- Family: Trochidae
- Genus: Ethminolia
- Species: E. degregorii

Binomial name
- Ethminolia degregorii (Caramagna, 1888)

Synonyms
- Gibbula De Gregorii Caramagna, 1888; Monilea degregorii (Caramagna, 1888)

= Ethminolia degregorii =

Species of gastropod

Ethminolia degregorii is a species of sea snail, a marine gastropod mollusk in the family Trochidae, the top snails.

== Description ==
The height of the shell attains 2 mm, its diameter 3 mm. The very fragile, umbilicate shell has a subdiscoidal shape and is delphinuliform. The depressed spire is conoidal and obtuse. The five whorls are spirally finely striate, in the middle slightly angled or subcarinate, and flattened between the carina and the suture. The carina is slightly crenulated on the body whorl posteriorly. The body whorl is rounded at the periphery. The convex base is deeply and broadly umbilicated and very finely corrugated. The simple aperture is elliptical and heliciform. The surface of the spire is ornamented with five reddish zones alternating with white punctate with rosy. The surface of the base of the body whorl is ornamented with regularly radiating costiform white maculations.

== Distribution ==
This species occurs in the Red Sea, the Gulf of Oman, the Arabian Sea and off Kuwait.
