= Zetela tangaroa =

Scientific classification
- Kingdom: Animalia
- Phylum: Mollusca
- Class: Gastropoda
- Subclass: Vetigastropoda
- Order: Trochida
- Superfamily: Trochoidea
- Family: Solariellidae
- Genus: Zetela
- Species: Z. tangaroa

Binomial name
- Zetela tangaroa Marshall, 1999

Species of gastropod

Zetela tangaroa is a species of sea snail, a marine gastropod mollusk in the family Solariellidae.

== Description ==
They have conic-shaped shells. The length of the shell attains 5.8 mm. This species is also known to be deposit feeders.

== Distribution ==
This marine species is endemic to New Zealand and is found off the Auckland Islands at depths between 490 and 1,019 m (1,608 and 3,343 ft).
