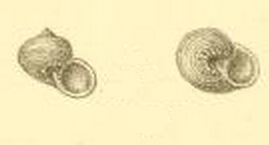
- Original drawing of a shell of Minolia rotundata

Scientific classification
- Kingdom: Animalia
- Phylum: Mollusca
- Class: Gastropoda
- Subclass: Vetigastropoda
- Order: Trochida
- Superfamily: Trochoidea
- Family: Solariellidae
- Genus: Minolia
- Species: M. rotundata

Binomial name
- Minolia rotundata (Sowerby III, 1894)

Synonyms
- Monilea rotundata Sowerby III, 1894

= Minolia rotundata =

Species of gastropod

Minolia rotundata is a species of sea snail, a marine gastropod mollusk in the family Solariellidae.

== Description ==
The height of the shell attains 3½ mm, its diameter also 3½ mm. The shell has a globose-conoidal shape and is profoundly umbilicated. It contains 4½ convex whorls with a short and obtuse spire. It is spirally lirated. The sutures are canaliculated. The body whorl is ventricated and has a slight angle. The aperture is rounded. There is a thick nodulous ridge bordering the umbilicus.

== Distribution ==
This species occurs off Hong Kong.
