= Minolia nyssonus =

Scientific classification
- Kingdom: Animalia
- Phylum: Mollusca
- Class: Gastropoda
- Subclass: Vetigastropoda
- Order: Trochida
- Superfamily: Trochoidea
- Family: Solariellidae
- Genus: Minolia
- Species: M. nyssonus

Binomial name
- Minolia nyssonus (Dall, 1919)

Synonyms
- Solariella nyssonus Dall, 1919

Species of gastropod

Minolia nyssonus is a species of sea snail, a marine gastropod mollusk in the family Solariellidae.

== Distribution ==
This marine species occurs off Japan at depths between 150 m and 200 m.
