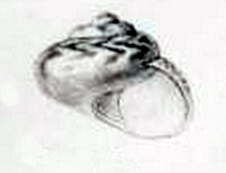
- Original image of a shell of Ethminolia iridifulgens

Scientific classification
- Kingdom: Animalia
- Phylum: Mollusca
- Class: Gastropoda
- Subclass: Vetigastropoda
- Order: Trochida
- Superfamily: Trochoidea
- Family: Trochidae
- Genus: Ethminolia
- Species: E. iridifulgens

Binomial name
- Ethminolia iridifulgens (Melvill, 1910)

Synonyms
- Solariella iridifulgens J.C. Melvill, 1910

= Ethminolia iridifulgens =

Species of gastropod

Ethminolia iridifulgens is a sea snail species, a marine gastropod mollusk in the Trochidae family, the top snails.

== Description ==
The height of the shell attains 4 mm, its diameter 6 mm. The umbilicate shell has a conical shape. It has five, striated, ventricose whorls. The two apical whorls are white. The body whorl increases rapidly in size and is rotund at the periphery. The umbilicus goes deep. The aperture is rotund and has a fine lip. The columella is simple. This rare, very fragile shell is brilliantly nacreous. Its colour is green, with violet and blue iris hues occurring. The fugitive outer cuticle shows rufous flames, depicted on a greyish ground.

== Distribution ==
This species occurs in the Arabian Sea and the Gulf of Oman.
