= Ethminolia hornungi =

Scientific classification
- Kingdom: Animalia
- Phylum: Mollusca
- Class: Gastropoda
- Subclass: Vetigastropoda
- Order: Trochida
- Superfamily: Trochoidea
- Family: Trochidae
- Genus: Ethminolia
- Species: E. hornungi

Binomial name
- Ethminolia hornungi (Bisacchi, 1931)

Synonyms
- Trochus hornungi Bisacchi, 1931=

Species of gastropod

Ethminolia hornungi is a species of sea snail, a marine gastropod mollusk in the family Trochidae, the top snails.

== Distribution ==
This species occurs in the Red Sea.
