= Zetela kopua =

Scientific classification
- Kingdom: Animalia
- Phylum: Mollusca
- Class: Gastropoda
- Subclass: Vetigastropoda
- Order: Trochida
- Superfamily: Trochoidea
- Family: Solariellidae
- Genus: Zetela
- Species: Z. kopua

Binomial name
- Zetela kopua Marshall, 1999

Species of gastropod

Zetela kopua is a species of sea snail, a marine gastropod mollusk in the family Solariellidae.

== Distribution ==
This marine species is endemic to New Zealand and found in the North Bounty Trough at depths between 1,186 m and 2,427 m.
