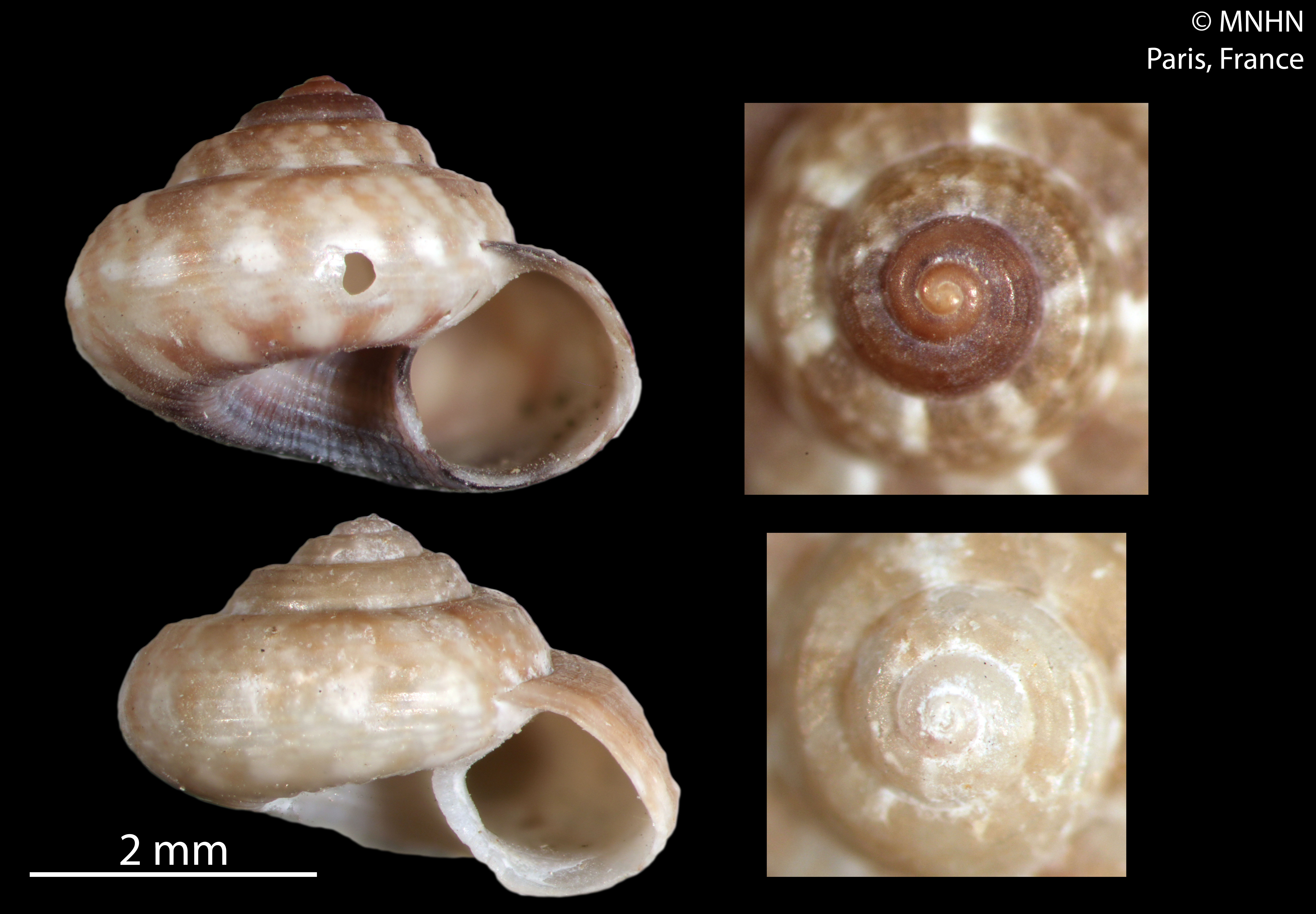

Scientific classification
- Kingdom: Animalia
- Phylum: Mollusca
- Class: Gastropoda
- Subclass: Vetigastropoda
- Order: Trochida
- Superfamily: Trochoidea
- Family: Trochidae
- Genus: Ethminolia
- Species: E. durbanensis

Binomial name
- Ethminolia durbanensis (Kilburn, 1977)

Synonyms
- Solariella durbanensis Kilburn, 1977

= Ethminolia durbanensis =

Species of gastropod

Ethminolia durbanensis is a species of sea snail, a marine gastropod mollusk in the family Trochidae, the top snails.

== Distribution ==
This species occurs in the Indian Ocean off Durban, Natal, South Africa.
