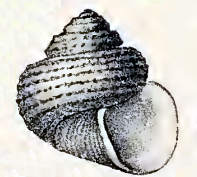
- Drawing of a shell of Ethminolia doriae

Scientific classification
- Kingdom: Animalia
- Phylum: Mollusca
- Class: Gastropoda
- Subclass: Vetigastropoda
- Order: Trochida
- Superfamily: Trochoidea
- Family: Trochidae
- Genus: Ethminolia
- Species: E. doriae

Binomial name
- Ethminolia doriae (Caramagna, 1888)

Synonyms
- Gibbula doriae Caramagna, 1888

= Ethminolia doriae =

Species of gastropod

Ethminolia doriae is a species of sea snail, a marine gastropod mollusk in the family Trochidae, the top snails.

== Description ==
The height of the shell attains 6½ mm, its diameter 6 mm. The solid, perforate shell has a conoidal shape. The 6½ whorls are angulate, excavated above, ornamented with granose cinguli with square red spots, and minutely longitudinally striate. The cinguli number 5 on penultimate whorl, 6 on the body whorl, which is angulate at its base. The base of the shell contains 7 concentric cinguli, tessellated red and white. The shell is rosy, sometimes olivaceous, ornamented with darker maculations on the body whorl, the cinguli tessellated. The suture is nearly filled by the first granose ridge. The wide umbilicus is profound, finely striate, and lightly cingulate. The smooth lip is crenated by the sulci of the outside. The simple columella is arcuate, lamellar, twisted at the umbilicus, forming a little canal at the base. The aperture is subrotund, whitish, rosy.

== Distribution ==
This species occurs in the Red Sea.
