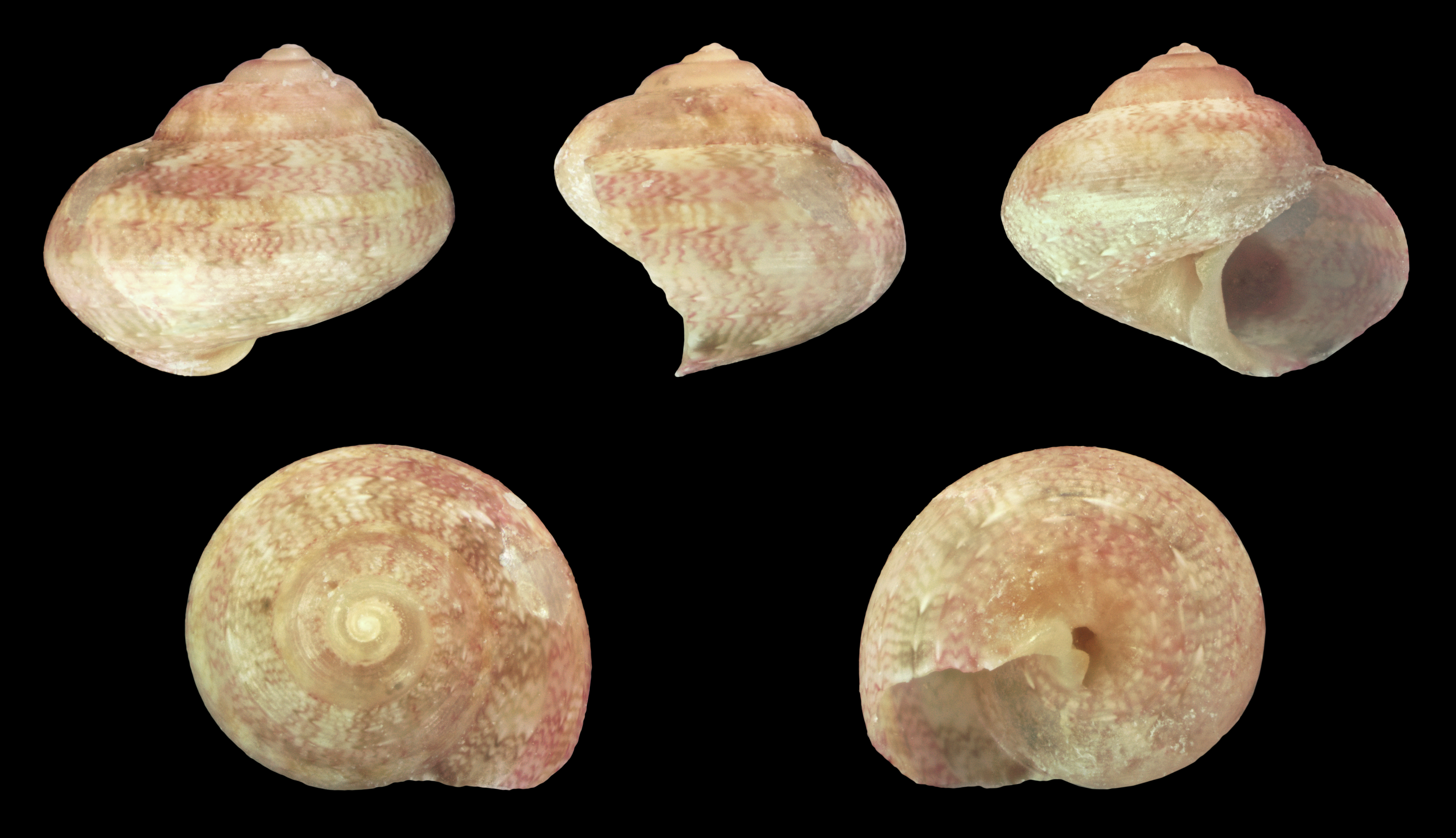

Scientific classification
- Kingdom: Animalia
- Phylum: Mollusca
- Class: Gastropoda
- Subclass: Vetigastropoda
- Order: Trochida
- Superfamily: Trochoidea
- Family: Trochidae
- Genus: Ethminolia
- Species: E. stearnsii

Binomial name
- Ethminolia stearnsii (Pilsbry, 1895)

Synonyms
- Minolia stearnsii Pilsbry, 1895 (basionym); Sericominolia stearnsii (Pilsbry, 1895); Solariella stearnsi (Pilsbry, 1895)

= Ethminolia stearnsii =

Species of gastropod

Ethminolia stearnsii is a species of sea snail, a marine gastropod mollusk in the family Trochidae, the top snails.

== Description ==
The shell of an adult varies between 3.5 mm and 10 mm. The shell is more depressed than Ethminolia vitiliginea (Menke, 1843). It is thin, shining and widely umbilicate. Its color pattern is densely and finely radially vermiculate with olivaceous on a pale ground above, usually with few or many radial dark clouds below the suture, and several narrow articulated, spaced spiral lines. The periphery is lighter, often spotted. The base of the shell shows a paler vermiculate and articulated pattern. The surface is closely and evenly sculptured with spiral striae throughout, with inconspicuous rather spaced oblique impressed lines, and between them very faint, close growth-striae which slightly crenulate the spirals. The five whorls are very convex, rather flattened below the sutures, and produce a blunt median angle on the whorls of the spire. The body whorl is subangular at the periphery and around the umbilicus. The latter is funnel-shaped, one-fourth the total diameter of the shell, white within and with distinct growth lines. The oblique aperture is roundly subquadrate. The columella is slightly dilated above, straight in the middle, and bluntly angular at base.

== Distribution ==
This species occurs in the Pacific Ocean off the Philippines and Japan.
