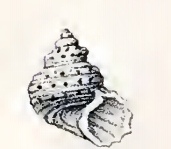
- Drawing of a shell of Minolia punctata

Scientific classification
- Kingdom: Animalia
- Phylum: Mollusca
- Class: Gastropoda
- Subclass: Vetigastropoda
- Order: Trochida
- Superfamily: Trochoidea
- Family: Solariellidae
- Genus: Minolia
- Species: M. punctata

Binomial name
- Minolia punctata A. Adams, 1860

Synonyms
- Minolia subangulata Kuroda & T. Habe, 1952 junior subjective synonym; Magarita punctata A. Adams

= Minolia punctata =

Species of gastropod

Minolia punctata is a species of sea snail, a marine gastropod mollusk in the family Solariellidae.

== Description ==
The length of the shell varies between 7 mm and 13 mm. The helicoid shell is widely umbilicated, fulvous, punctate with red. The 6½ whorls are convex and somewhat loosely rolled on themselves which causes the sutures to very deep. They are traversed by spiral granulose cinguli ornamented with red dots, and alternately larger and smaller. The interstices are beautifully clathrate with delicate oblique lamellae. The body whorl is at the peristome almost disunited from the penultimate whorl. The suture is canaliculate. The umbilicus is perspective, with concentric granulose cinguli. The interstices are closely clathrate.

== Distribution ==
This species occurs in the Western Pacific and off Taiwan and Japan.
