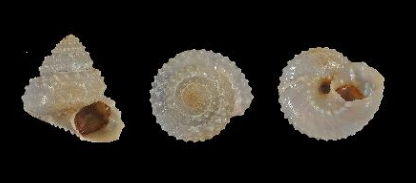
- Shell of Zetela williamsae (holotype in MNHN, Paris)

Scientific classification
- Kingdom: Animalia
- Phylum: Mollusca
- Class: Gastropoda
- Subclass: Vetigastropoda
- Order: Trochida
- Superfamily: Trochoidea
- Family: Solariellidae
- Genus: Zetela
- Species: Z. williamsae

Binomial name
- Zetela williamsae Vilvens, 2022

= Zetela williamsae =

Species of gastropod

Zetela williamsae is a species of sea snail, a marine gastropod mollusk in the family Solariellidae, the top snails.

== Distribution ==
This species occurs in the Mozambican part of the Mozambique Channel.
