= Minolia watanabei =

Scientific classification
- Kingdom: Animalia
- Phylum: Mollusca
- Class: Gastropoda
- Subclass: Vetigastropoda
- Order: Trochida
- Superfamily: Trochoidea
- Family: Solariellidae
- Genus: Minolia
- Species: M. watanabei

Binomial name
- Minolia watanabei (Shikama, 1962)

Synonyms
- Hazuregyra watanabei Shikama, 1962 (superseded combination)

Species of gastropod

Minolia watanabei is a species of sea snail, a marine gastropod mollusk in the family Solariellidae.

== Description ==
The shell grows to a length of 6 mm.

== Distribution ==
This marine shell occurs off Japan.
