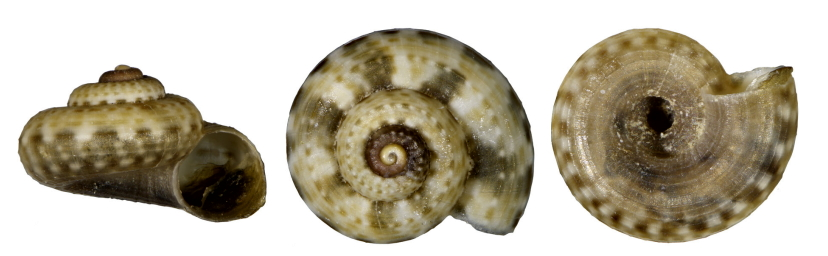
- Shell of Ethminolia hickmanae (holotype)
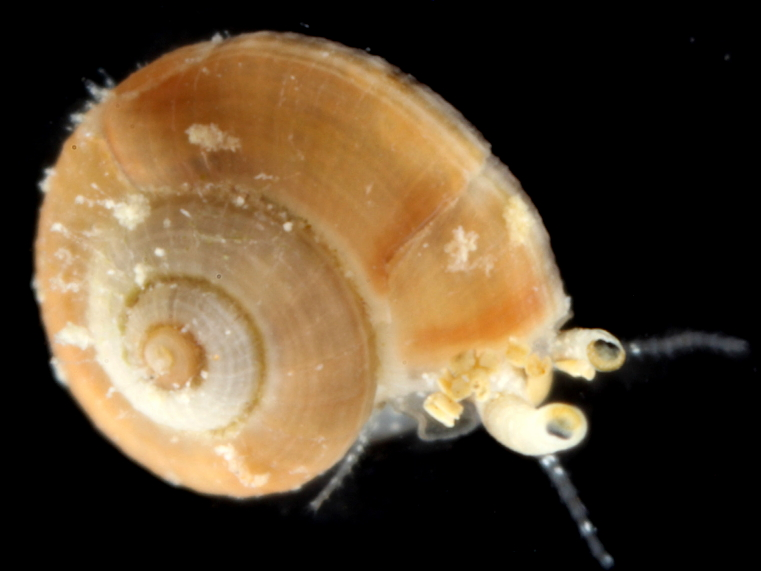
- living specimen of Ethminolia hickmanae

Scientific classification
- Kingdom: Animalia
- Phylum: Mollusca
- Class: Gastropoda
- Subclass: Vetigastropoda
- Order: Trochida
- Superfamily: Trochoidea
- Family: Trochidae
- Genus: Ethminolia
- Species: E. hickmanae

Binomial name
- Ethminolia hickmanae [D. G. Herbert, 2024

= Ethminolia hickmanae =

Species of gastropod

Ethminolia hickmanae is a species of sea snail, a marine gastropod mollusk in the family Trochidae, the top snails.

== Description ==
The holotype measures 1.3 mm in height and 2.0 mm in diameter; the largest specimen attains a diameter of 2.3 mm.

(Original description) The shell is very small, with adult specimens reaching a diameter of up to 2.3 mm, and is wider than high (H/D 0.62–0.70). The spire is low, and the whorls are evenly rounded, with the periphery at mid‑whorl and the suture strongly indented. The sculpture consists predominantly of low, evenly spaced spiral cords. The base is rounded and widely umbilicate, and the teleoconch comprises up to 3.3 whorls.

The first teleoconch whorl bears three fine spiral lirae, which strengthen on the second whorl and become more cord‑like, increasing to six to eight in number by intercalation of intermediate cords. Axial sculpture consists of close‑set microscopic axial threads together with stronger, more widely spaced axial riblets that produce a regular net‑like cancellate pattern; the riblets are raised to form small nodules where they cross the spiral cords. The sculpture on subsequent whorls is similar, although the axial riblets are less regularly spaced. Basal sculpture is likewise similar, but the cords become thinner and more numerous toward and within the umbilicus. The umbilical rim is evenly rounded and is rendered weakly plicate by the axial riblets. The aperture is circular, and the peristome is almost radial and briefly interrupted across the parietal region. The outer lip is simple, and the interior is nacreous.

The colour and pattern are highly variable. The ground colour ranges from dirty white to dark purplish brown and is variously mottled with darker and lighter spots, blotches, and flames. Pale specimens frequently show darker marks radiating from the suture and blotches at the periphery. The spiral cords are commonly spotted with white, particularly below the periphery. Rare specimens exhibit a "candy‑stripe" pattern. The protoconch is usually whitish or pale, but occasionally it is almost black.

The protoconch is typical for the subfamily Umboniinae, with a diameter of 160–180 µm. An apical beak is present and confluent with the terminal lip. The apical bulb is sculptured with oblique threads that are crossed by subspiral threads, and the terminal lip is weakly convex.

The operculum is corneous and multispiral, with relatively narrow whorls. No spiral microsculpture is evident. The peripheral fringe is rather broad, and its radial striations remain visible on the earlier whorls.

The radula has the formula ∞+5+1+5+∞ and about 20 transverse rows of teeth. The teeth of the central field are reduced to very thin, overlapping base‑plates, the inner ones bearing only a vestige of an anterior shaft; the fifth lateral tooth is subquadrate. No distinct transitional latero‑marginal tooth is evident. The marginal teeth are well developed, with a narrow shaft and a strongly recurved cusp. The cusps of the inner marginal teeth are ovate and carry a rounded central denticle flanked by three progressively smaller, more pointed denticles on each side. Marginal teeth become progressively smaller toward the radula margin, and their cusps are more finely denticulate.

Little detail of the external anatomy can be seen in rehydrated specimens, but photographs of living animals indicate that the right eyestalk is larger than the left.

== Distribution ==
This marine species occurs off New Caledonia and Fiji.
