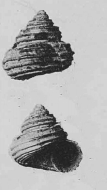
- Original image of the shell of Minolia pseudobscura

Scientific classification
- Kingdom: Animalia
- Phylum: Mollusca
- Class: Gastropoda
- Subclass: Vetigastropoda
- Order: Trochida
- Superfamily: Trochoidea
- Family: Solariellidae
- Genus: Minolia
- Species: M. pseudobscura

Binomial name
- Minolia pseudobscura (Yokoyama, 1927)

Synonyms
- Solariella pseudobscura Yokoyama, 1927

= Minolia pseudobscura =

Extinct species of gastropod

Minolia pseudobscura is a fossil species of sea snail, a marine gastropod mollusk in the family Solariellidae.

== Distribution ==
This fossil species occurs in Japan and South Australia. The small, solid shell has a depressed-conical shape. Its height attains 11 mm and its diameter also 11 mm. The shell contains seven whorls and a wide open umbilicus. The nucleus is smooth and rounded. The other whorls are tabulate with an almost horizontal surface and the lateral surface vertical and somewhat convex. The aperture is subcircular. The thin peristome is continuous.
