= Zetela praetextilis =

Scientific classification
- Kingdom: Animalia
- Phylum: Mollusca
- Class: Gastropoda
- Subclass: Vetigastropoda
- Order: Trochida
- Superfamily: Trochoidea
- Family: Solariellidae
- Genus: Zetela
- Species: †Z. praetextilis

Binomial name
- †Zetela praetextilis (Suter, 1917)

Synonyms
- Solariella praetextilis Suter, 1917

Extinct species of gastropod

Zetela praetextilis is an extinct species of sea snail, a marine gastropod mollusk, in the family Solariellidae. This species occurs in New Zealand.

== Description ==
The small, thin shell is conoidal and very moderately umbilicated. It shows oblique axial riblets on the upper whorls, reduced to gemmules upon the spiral lirae on the lower whorls.

Sculpture: The protoconch is spirally striated, the succeeding two or three whorls show oblique, retractive, fine axial riblets, about 30 on a whorl, that are present on the lower whorls only below the suture, but further down by round gemmules upon the spiral threads, which is number 6 on the penultimate whorl. On the body whorl, there are 2 stronger and a little more distant spirals at the periphery, rendering it faintly bicarinate. On the base, there are 1 or 2 fine spiral threads below the periphery, the space between them and the umbilicus bearing fine radial riblets. The umbilicus is margined by a strongly gemmate ridge, followed by a finer one inside the umbilicus. The spire conoidal, a little lower than the height of the aperture. The protoconch is small, convex, with a few spirals. The shell contains 4½ convex whorls. The body whorl is faintly bicarinate, the base flatly convex. The suture is canaliculate. The aperture is hidden by the matrix. The deep umbilicus is moderate, not quite one-third of the greatest diameter.
