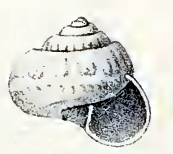
- Drawing of a shell of Ethminolia hemprichii

Scientific classification
- Kingdom: Animalia
- Phylum: Mollusca
- Class: Gastropoda
- Subclass: Vetigastropoda
- Order: Trochida
- Superfamily: Trochoidea
- Family: Trochidae
- Genus: Ethminolia
- Species: E. hemprichii

Binomial name
- Ethminolia hemprichii (Issel, 1869)

Synonyms
- Gibbula hemprichii (Issel, 1869); Minolia hemprichi Bouchet & Danrigal, 1982; Trochus hemprichii Issel, 1869 (original description)

= Ethminolia hemprichii =

Species of gastropod

Ethminolia hemprichii is a species of small sea snail, a marine gastropod mollusk or micromollusk in the family Trochidae, the top snails.

In 2008 this species was placed in the genus Ethminolia by Rusmore-Villaume.

== Description ==
The height of the shell attains 2½ mm, its diameter also 2½ mm. The minute, umbilicate shell has an orbiculate-conoid shape. Under a lens it is longitudinally striate. It is shining, whitish, painted with oblique chestnut streaks, and spotted with brown. The apex is rather obtuse. The five whorls are regularly increasing, rather convex, and flattened at the distinctly impressed sutures. The body whorl scarcely equals half the total altitude. The base of the shell is rounded or obscurely subangular. The aperture has a quadrate-rounded shape. The simple peristome is acute. The columella is subtruncate at its base. The umbilicus is rather narrow and funnel-shaped.

== Distribution ==
This species occurs in the Red Sea. It also occurs in the Mediterranean Sea off Israel as an introduced species.
