= Zetela castigata =

Scientific classification
- Kingdom: Animalia
- Phylum: Mollusca
- Class: Gastropoda
- Subclass: Vetigastropoda
- Order: Trochida
- Superfamily: Trochoidea
- Family: Solariellidae
- Genus: Zetela
- Species: †Z. castigata

Binomial name
- †Zetela castigata (Marwick, 1931)

Synonyms
- Antisolarium castigatum Marwick, 1931

Extinct species of gastropod

Zetela castigata is an extinct species of sea snail, a marine gastropod mollusk, in the family Solariellidae.

== Distribution ==
This species occurs in New Zealand.
