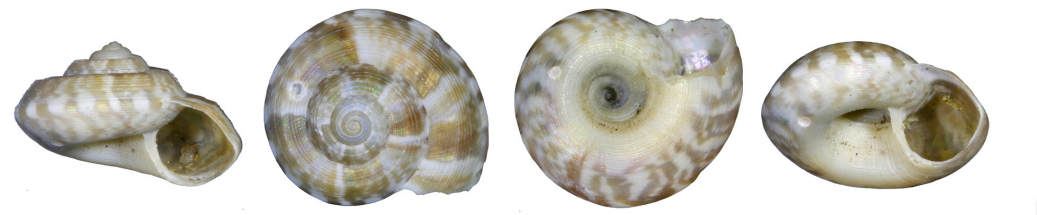
- Shell of Ethminolia probabilis (topotype)

Scientific classification
- Kingdom: Animalia
- Phylum: Mollusca
- Class: Gastropoda
- Subclass: Vetigastropoda
- Order: Trochida
- Superfamily: Trochoidea
- Family: Trochidae
- Genus: Ethminolia
- Species: E. probabilis

Binomial name
- Ethminolia probabilis Iredale, 1924

Synonyms
- Ethminolia mayi Kershaw, R.C., 1955; Minolia angulata (A. Adams, 1853) (misidentification); Monilea (Minolia) prodictus (P. Fischer, 1879); Trochus (Solariella) prodictus P. Fischer, 1879 superseded combination; Margarita angulata A. Adams, 1853; Trochus prodictus Fischer, 1879

= Ethminolia probabilis =

Species of gastropod

Ethminolia probabilis is a species of sea snail, a marine gastropod mollusk in the family Trochidae, the top snails. It is a benthic filter-feeder.

== Description ==
The shell has a maximum width of 8 mm (0.31 in) and a maximum length of 5 mm (0.20 in). The whorls are angled at the periphery, and the umbilicus is broad and extends to the apex, as well as lacking a marginal rib. It varies from pink to fawn in coloration, and occasionally possesses axial streaks.

== Distribution ==
This marine species is native to Australia, from Manning River, New South Wales to Lake's Entrance, Victoria, as well as Tasmania. It is subtidal, living at a depth of up to 70 m (230 ft)
