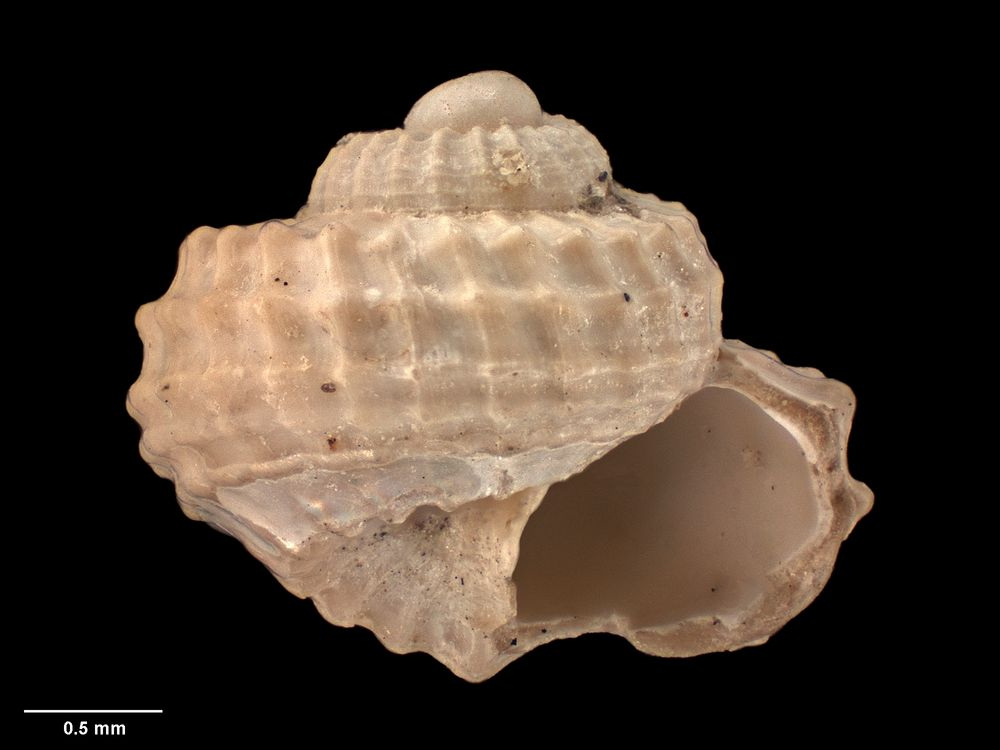
- Shell of Zetela variabilis (specimen at the Museum of New Zealand)

Scientific classification
- Kingdom: Animalia
- Phylum: Mollusca
- Class: Gastropoda
- Subclass: Vetigastropoda
- Order: Trochida
- Superfamily: Trochoidea
- Family: Solariellidae
- Genus: Zetela
- Species: Z. variabilis

Binomial name
- Zetela variabilis Dell, 1956

Synonyms
- Solariella variabilis (Murdoch & Suter, 1906)

= Zetela variabilis =

Species of gastropod

Zetela variabilis is a minute deepwater species of sea snail, a marine gastropod mollusk in the family Solariellidae.

== Description ==
The length of the shell attains 5.75 mm.

== Distribution ==
This marine species is endemic to New Zealand and occurs off Pitt Island, South Island and Chatham Island at a depth of 284 m.
