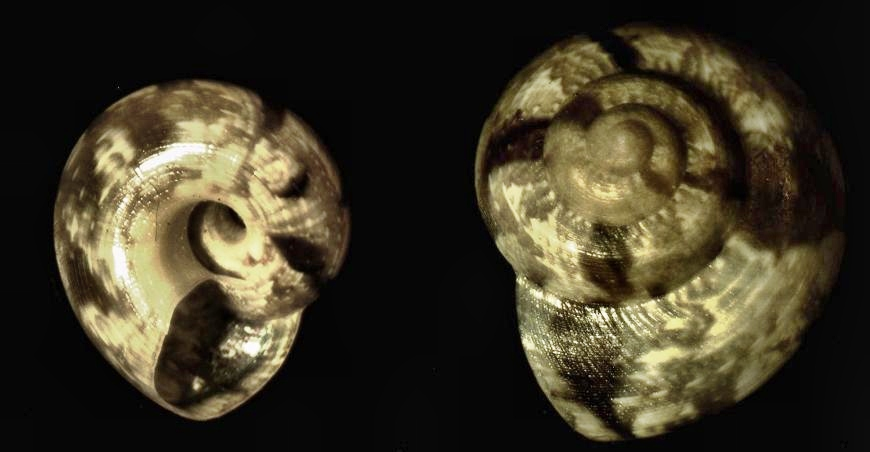
- shells of Ethminolia vitiliginea

Scientific classification
- Kingdom: Animalia
- Phylum: Mollusca
- Class: Gastropoda
- Subclass: Vetigastropoda
- Order: Trochida
- Family: Trochidae
- Genus: Ethminolia; Iredale, 1924

Type species
- Ethminolia probabilis Iredale, 1924

Synonyms
- Umbonium (Ethminolia) Iredale, 1924 superseded rank

= Ethminolia =

Genus of gastropods

Ethminolia is a genus of sea snails, marine gastropod mollusks in the subfamily Umboniinae of the family Trochidae, the top snails.

== General characteristics ==
The shell is small (diameter usually less than 10 mm) and appreciably wider than high. The whorls are rounded and often shouldered, and the sculpture consists of spiral lirae or cords accompanied by microscopic axial threads. The umbilicus is broad, its rim rounded and not thickened, and it lacks any internal funicle. The outer lip is simple, and the interior is nacreous without inrunning ridges.

The operculum is corneous and multispiral, with a well‑developed peripheral fringe that is radially striate; these striations remain visible on the earlier whorls, and spiral microsculpture is present.

The radula has thin base‑plates on the rachidian and lateral teeth that narrow anteriorly, with the outer edge rounded, raised anteriorly, and somewhat twisted; the fifth lateral tooth is scarcely evident. The inner marginal tooth is transitional, with a reduced cusp. The cusps of the inner marginal teeth are short and broad, with cusps 2–10 the largest and coarsely dentate; the central denticle is asymmetrical and somewhat broader than the others, and additional narrower denticles are present on both margins. The ctenidium remains unknown.

== Distribution ==
This marine genus occurs in the Red Sea, Gulf of Oman, the Arabian Sea and off Australia (New South Wales, South Australia, Victoria, Western Australia) and Tasmania.

== Species ==
Species within the genus Ethminolia include:

- Ethminolia akuana Raines, 2007
- Ethminolia degregorii (Caramagna, 1888)
- Ethminolia doriae (Caramagna, 1888)
- Ethminolia durbanensis (Kilburn, 1977)
- Ethminolia elveri Cotton & Godfrey, 1938
- Ethminolia eudeli (Deshayes, 1863)
- Ethminolia gravieri (Lamy, 1909)
- Ethminolia hemprichii Issel, 1869
- Ethminolia hickmanae D. G. Herbert, 2024
- Ethminolia hornungi (Bisacchi, 1931)
- Ethminolia impressa (G. Nevill & H. Nevill, 1869)
- Ethminolia iridifulgens (Melvill, 1910)
- Ethminolia ornatissima (Schepman, 1908)
- Ethminolia probabilis Iredale, 1924
- Ethminolia sculpta (G.B. Sowerby III, 1897)
- Ethminolia vanxinhi Thach, 2025
- Ethminolia vitiliginea (Menke, 1843)
- † Ethminolia wareni Helwerda, Wesselingh & S. T. Williams, 2014

Species brought into synonymy

- Ethminolia bysma Herbert, 1992: synonym of Ethalia bysma Herbert, 1992
- Ethminolia cincta Cotton & Godfrey, 1938: synonym of Spectamen cinctum (Cotton & Godfrey, 1938) (original combination)
- Ethminolia glaphyrella (Melvill & Standen, 1895): synonym of Kanakina glaphyrella (Melvill & Standen, 1895) (superseded combination)
- Ethminolia mayi Kershaw, 1955: synonym of Ethminolia probabilis Iredale, 1924
- Ethminolia nektonica (Okutani, 1961): synonym of Tylorhaphe nektonica (Okutani, 1961) (superseded combination)
- Ethminolia stearnsii (Pilsbry, 1895): synonym of Sericominolia stearnsii (Pilsbry, 1895)
- Ethminolia tasmanica Macpherson, J.H. & Gabriel, C.J. 1962: synonym of Ethminolia vitiliginea (Menke, 1843)
