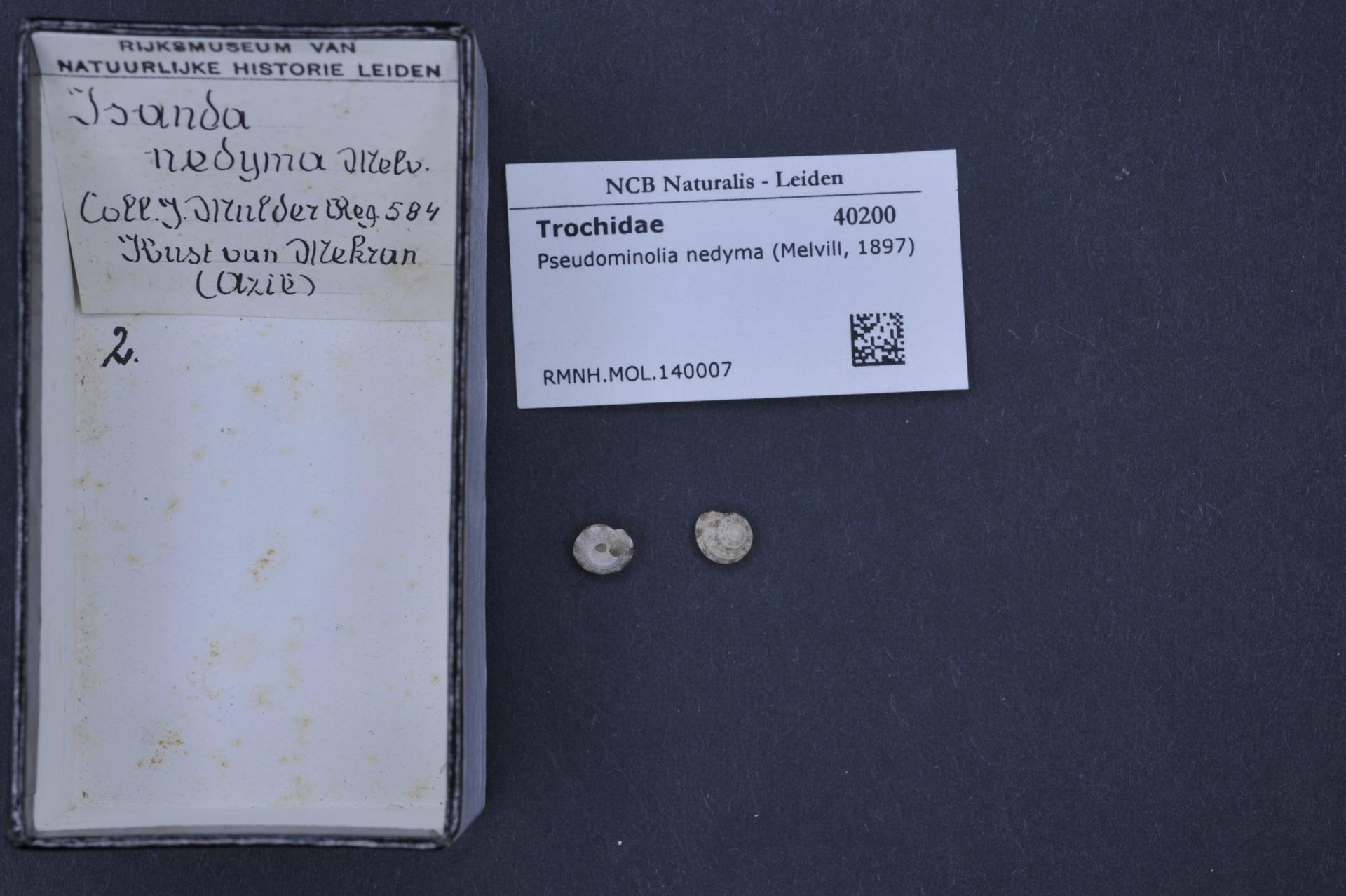

Scientific classification
- Kingdom: Animalia
- Phylum: Mollusca
- Class: Gastropoda
- Subclass: Vetigastropoda
- Order: Trochida
- Superfamily: Trochoidea
- Family: Trochidae
- Genus: Pseudominolia
- Species: P. nedyma

Binomial name
- Pseudominolia nedyma (Melvill, 1897)

Synonyms
- Minolia nedyma Melvill, 1897; Pseudominolia nedyma Bosch et al., 1995

= Pseudominolia nedyma =

Species of gastropod

Pseudominolia nedyma is a species of sea snail, a marine gastropod mollusk in the family Trochidae, the top snails.

== Description ==
The length of the shell varies between 3.5 mm and 5.5 mm. The wide and deeply umbilicate shell has a depressed-conical shape. The color is highly variable. The spire is gradated, with five whorls with a dense spiral sculpture. It contains gray longitudinal flames of different shapes. The body whorl increases rapidly in size. It is regularly spirally sulcated and longitudinally crossed with dark spots. At the periphery it is rotund-angulate. The base of the shell contains concentric costae. The aperture is round. The lip is simple.

== Distribution ==
This species occurs in the Persian Gulf (off Bandar Abbas), the Red Sea (in abundant quantities) and in the Mediterranean Sea.
