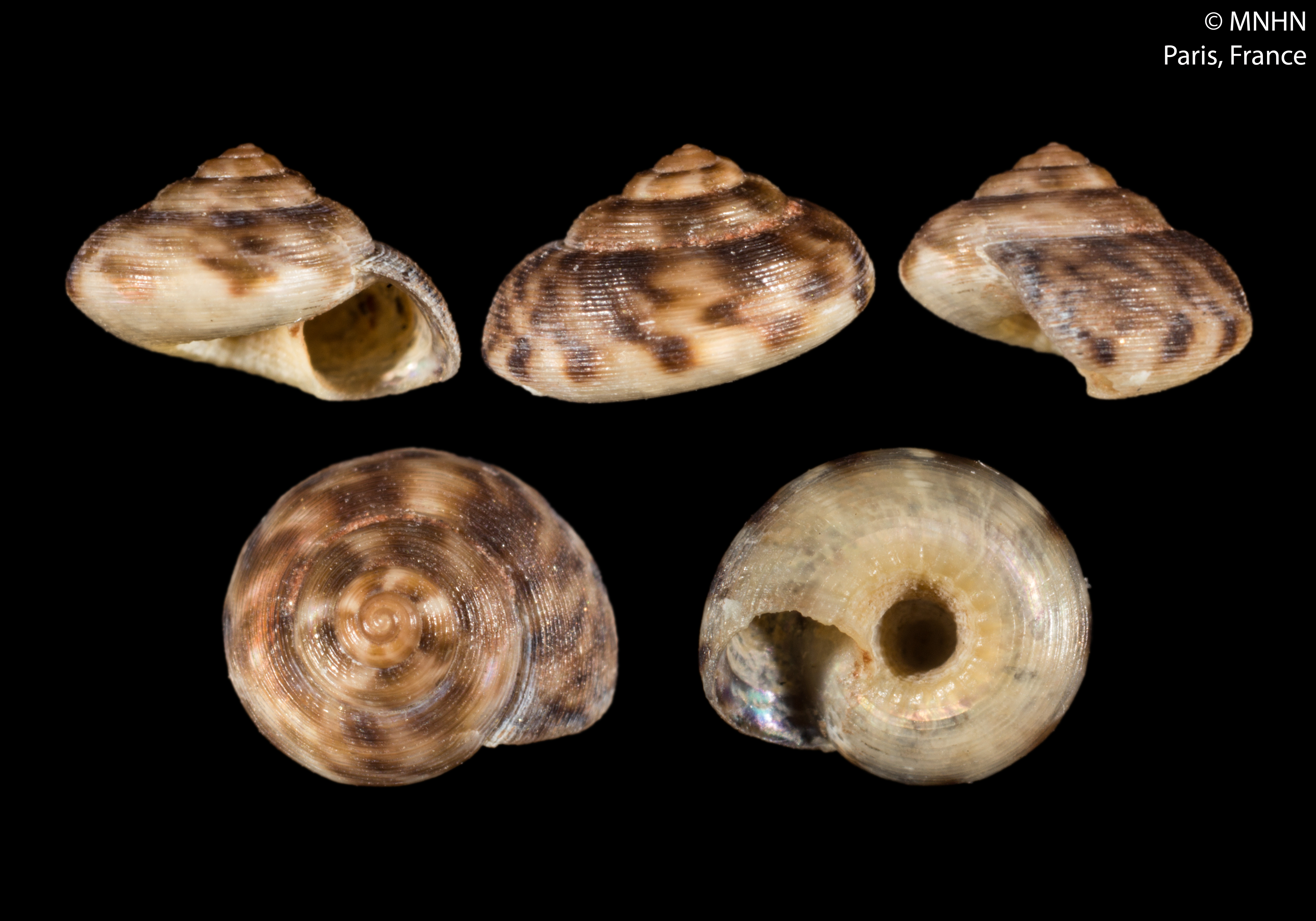
- Shell of Ethminolia eudeli (syntype at MNHN, Paris)

Scientific classification
- Kingdom: Animalia
- Phylum: Mollusca
- Class: Gastropoda
- Subclass: Vetigastropoda
- Order: Trochida
- Superfamily: Trochoidea
- Family: Trochidae
- Genus: Ethminolia
- Species: E. eudeli

Binomial name
- Ethminolia eudeli (Deshayes, 1863)

Synonyms
- Minolia eudeli (Deshayes, 1863) (superseded combination); Trochus (Margarita) eudeli Deshayes, 1863; Trochus eudeli Deshayes, 1863

= Ethminolia eudeli =

Species of gastropod

Ethminolia eudeli is a species of sea snail, a marine gastropod mollusk, in the subfamily Umboniinae of the family Trochidae.

== Distribution ==
This marine species occurs in the Indian Ocean off Réunion.
