= Ethminolia impressa =

Scientific classification
- Kingdom: Animalia
- Phylum: Mollusca
- Class: Gastropoda
- Subclass: Vetigastropoda
- Order: Trochida
- Superfamily: Trochoidea
- Family: Trochidae
- Genus: Ethminolia
- Species: E. impressa

Binomial name
- Ethminolia impressa (G. Nevill & H. Nevill, 1869)

Synonyms
- Minolia eucoronata G.B. Sowerby III, 1905; Minolia impressa (G. Nevill & H. Nevill, 1869); Solarium impressum G. Nevill & H. Nevill, 1869

Species of gastropod

Ethminolia impressa is a species of sea snail, a marine gastropod mollusk in the family Trochidae, the top snails.

== Distribution ==
This marine species occurs off New Caledonia.
