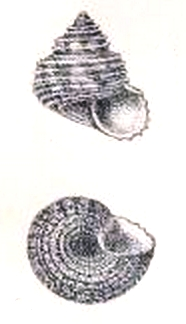
- Original drawing with two views of a shell of Pseudominolia gradata

Scientific classification
- Kingdom: Animalia
- Phylum: Mollusca
- Class: Gastropoda
- Subclass: Vetigastropoda
- Order: Trochida
- Superfamily: Trochoidea
- Family: Trochidae
- Genus: Pseudominolia
- Species: P. gradata

Binomial name
- Pseudominolia gradata (G. B. Sowerby III, 1895)

Synonyms
- Minolia gradata G. B. Sowerby III, 1895 (original combination)

= Pseudominolia gradata =

Species of gastropod

Pseudominolia gradata is a species of sea snail, a marine gastropod mollusk in the family Trochidae, the top snails.

== Description ==
The size of the shell varies between 3 mm and 8 mm. The turbinate shell is widely and profoundly perforated. It is white with radially large, brown spots. The apex is acute. The sutures are narrowly channeled. The six whorls are angulated, with the upper whorl is concave to flat. The spire is adorned with oblique striae. and two keels (with narrow lirae between them). The body whorlis biangulate and contains irregular 3 to 4 carinae. The convex base is finely striated and laminated and provided with six rounded lirae. The aperture is slightly oblique and is subquadrate. The peristome is sharp.

== Distribution ==
This species occurs in the Red Sea and in the Eastern Indian Ocean and off Sri Lanka
