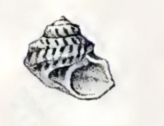
- Drawing of a shell of Pseudominolia biangulosa

Scientific classification
- Kingdom: Animalia
- Phylum: Mollusca
- Class: Gastropoda
- Subclass: Vetigastropoda
- Order: Trochida
- Superfamily: Trochoidea
- Family: Trochidae
- Genus: Pseudominolia
- Species: P. biangulosa

Binomial name
- Pseudominolia biangulosa (A. Adams, 1854)

Synonyms
- Margarita biangulosa A. Adams, 1854; Margarita triangulosa Sowerby; Minolia biangulosa (A. Adams, 1854)

= Pseudominolia biangulosa =

Species of gastropod

Pseudominolia biangulosa is a species of sea snail, a marine gastropod mollusk in the family Trochidae, the top snails.

== Description ==
The size of the shell attains 2 mm. The broadly umbilicate, smooth shell has an orbicular-conical shape. Its color is brown, closely painted with longitudinal undulating lines. The planulate whorls are angulate above, the body whorl biangulate. The sutures are margined. The convex base of the shell is concentrically cingulate. The umbilicus is perspective, its margin crenulated, its interior elegantly decussated by transverse and radiating lines.

== Distribution ==
This species occurs in the Red Sea and off Thailand.
