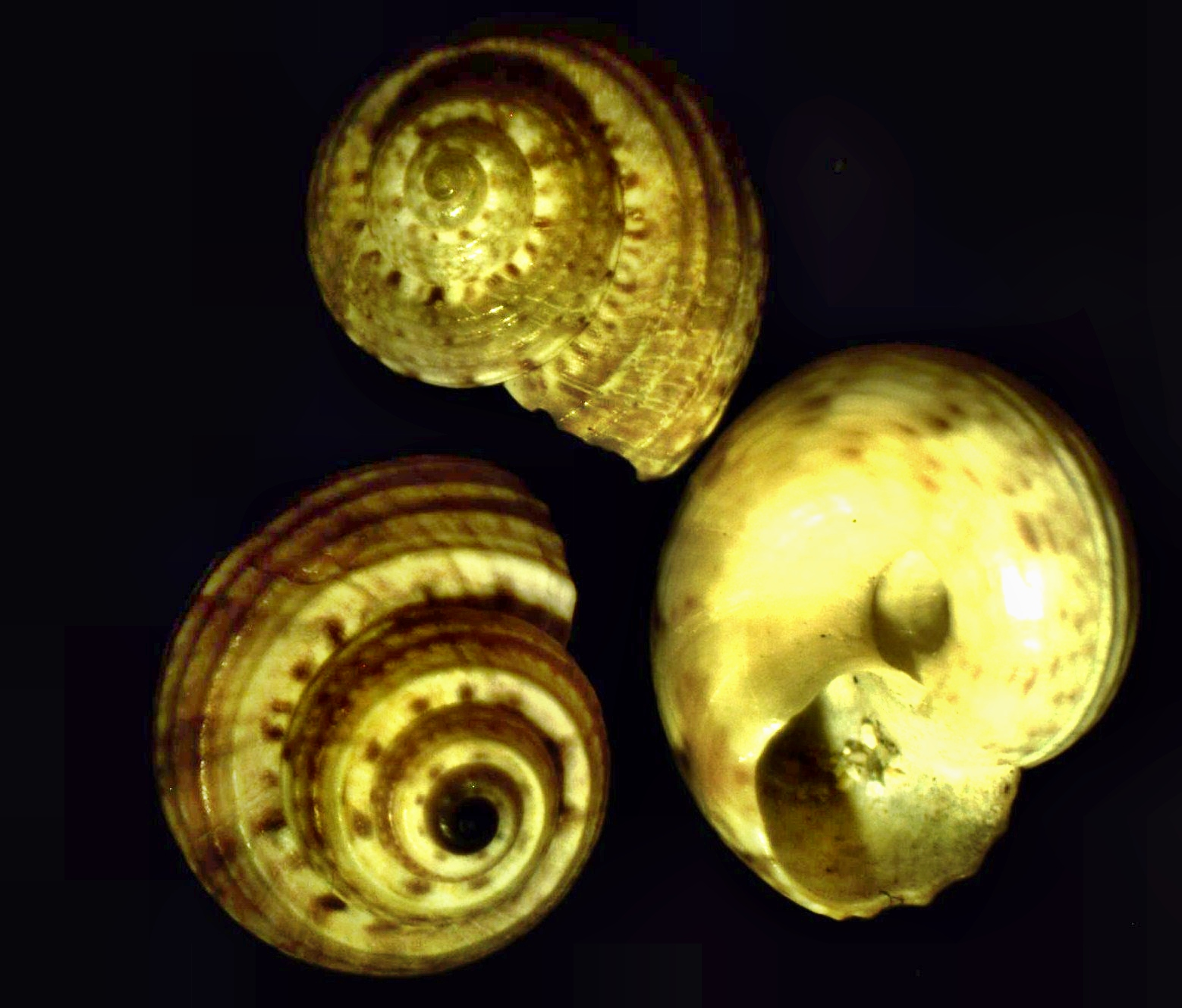
- Several views of a shell of Pseudominolia articulata

Scientific classification
- Kingdom: Animalia
- Phylum: Mollusca
- Class: Gastropoda
- Subclass: Vetigastropoda
- Order: Trochida
- Superfamily: Trochoidea
- Family: Trochidae
- Genus: Pseudominolia
- Species: P. articulata

Binomial name
- Pseudominolia articulata (Gould, 1861)

Synonyms
- Gibbula articulata (Gould, 1861); Margarita articulata Gould, 1861 (original description); Minolia articulata (Gould, 1861); Minolia bleeki (Gould, 1861); Solariella algoensis Thiele, 1925; Solariella dilecta (Sowerby III, 1899); Trochus (Solariella) dilectus Sowerby III, 1899; Trochus dilectus Sowerby III, 1899

= Pseudominolia articulata =

Species of gastropod

Pseudominolia articulata is a species of sea snail, a marine gastropod mollusk in the family Trochidae, the top snails.

== Description ==
The height of the shell attains 6 mm, its diameter 7 mm. The shell horn is colored with spots of brown, which equally divide the space with ground color on the spiral keels. There is a line of commashaped spots which extend from the summit into the flat space anterior to it. The 2½ white, nuclear whorls are small, well rounded and smooth. The shell contains 3⅓ postnuclear whorls. The first two are marked by three strong lamellar spiral keels, the last by four between the summit and the periphery. The keels are equally spaced, the fourth being at the periphery, while the first is a little further from the summit than it is from its neighbor anteriorly. In addition to the spiral sculpture, the whorls are marked by very slender, closely spaced, axial threads which are best developed in the spaces between the spiral cords. The periphery and the base are well rounded, the latter broadly umbilicated and marked by 10 depressed spiral cords which are truncated posteriorly and slope gently anteriorly. The whole has the appearance of a series of imbricating bands. In addition to these, there are three cords in the umbilicus wider and stronger than those on the base. These cords are crossed by closely spaced riblets which give them a peculiarly notched appearance. The aperture is subcircular. The outer lip is rendered sinuous by the spiral keels. The slender columella is strongly curved. The parietal wall is covered with a thin callus.

== Distribution ==
This marine species occurs off Cape of Good Hope, South Africa.
