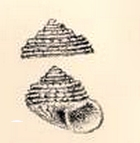
- Original drawing with two views of a shell of Pseudominolia splendens

Scientific classification
- Kingdom: Animalia
- Phylum: Mollusca
- Class: Gastropoda
- Subclass: Vetigastropoda
- Order: Trochida
- Superfamily: Trochoidea
- Family: Trochidae
- Genus: Pseudominolia
- Species: P. splendens

Binomial name
- Pseudominolia splendens (G.B. Sowerby III, 1897)

Synonyms
- Minolia splendens (G.B. Sowerby III, 1897); Monilia variegata Odhner, 1919; Monilia variegata Odhner, 1919; Solariella splendens G.B Sowerby III, 1897 (original combination)

= Pseudominolia splendens =

Species of gastropod

Pseudominolia splendens is a species of sea snail, a marine gastropod mollusk in the family Trochidae.

== Description ==
The height of the shell attains 11 mm. This shining shell with red spots has a depressed-orbicular shape and is smooth below. The gradated, conical spire has an acute apex. It contains 6½ whorls with spirally granulated lirae. The body whorl has a depressed rotund shape. On top it shows an angle, below it is rotund. The body whorl contains seven lirae, the upper ones granulated, the others plane. The shell has a wide and deep umbilicus. It contains seven ridges above the periphery, the upper ridges being beaded. The base of the shell is convex. The aperture is slightly oblique and subquadrate. The oblique columella has a slight callus.

== Distribution ==
This species occurs in the Indian Ocean off Madagascar and off KwaZuluNatal, South Africa.
