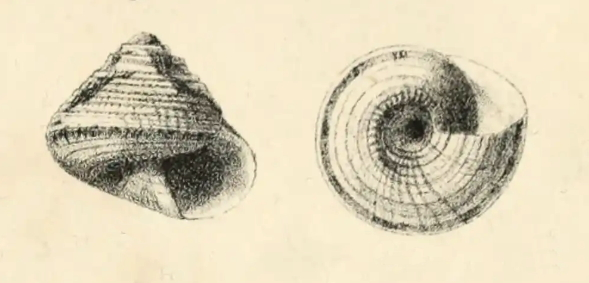
- Drawing of a shell of Minolia casta (holotype)

Scientific classification
- Kingdom: Animalia
- Phylum: Mollusca
- Class: Gastropoda
- Subclass: Vetigastropoda
- Order: Trochida
- Superfamily: Trochoidea
- Family: Solariellidae
- Genus: Minolia
- Species: M. casta

Binomial name
- Minolia casta (G. Nevill & H. Nevill, 1874)

Synonyms
- Minolops casta (Nevill & Nevill, 1874); Trochus (Solariella) castus G. & H. Nevill, 1874

= Minolia casta =

Species of gastropod

Minolia casta is a species of sea snail, a marine gastropod mollusk in the family Solariellidae.

== Description ==
The length of the shell attains 7.5 mm, its diameter 9 mm.

(Original description) The shell is conoidal and glabrous. It is white, ornamented with brown, sometimes in distant broad flames and sometimes in minute, closely set reticulations. The base is white and, on its outer half only, is streaked or marbled with brown. The shell has five to six whorls, which are angular and spirally keeled, with four to five prominent keels.

The outer half of the base bears five distant, impressed spiral lines. Around, and extending into, the open and deep umbilicus there are about six spiral rows of close, oblique granules, of which the outermost row is the largest.

== Distribution ==
This species occurs in the Indian Ocean off India and Sri Lanka
