= Pseudominolia climacota =

Scientific classification
- Kingdom: Animalia
- Phylum: Mollusca
- Class: Gastropoda
- Subclass: Vetigastropoda
- Order: Trochida
- Superfamily: Trochoidea
- Family: Trochidae
- Genus: Pseudominolia
- Species: P. climacota

Binomial name
- Pseudominolia climacota (Melvill, 1897)

Synonyms
- Minolia climacota Melvill, 1897

Species of gastropod

Pseudominolia climacota is a species of sea snail, a marine gastropod mollusk in the family Trochidae, the top snails.

The epithet "climacota" is derived from the Greek word for "terraced".

== Description ==
The height of the shell attains 14 mm, its diameter also 14 mm. The solid shell has a gradated conical shape. It is subdepressed and narrowly umbilicate,. Its color is white-ochraceous or white-cinereous. The shell contains seven whorls with much impressed sutures. The whorls are irregularly spirally deeply lirate. The lirae are conspicuously sulculose with triangular blotches of black-brown painting. The smooth base is plane but triangular at the periphery. Below the periphery it is ornated with brown to ashy gray flames. The aperture is angulated round with a simple lip.

== Distribution ==
This marine species occurs off Iran.
