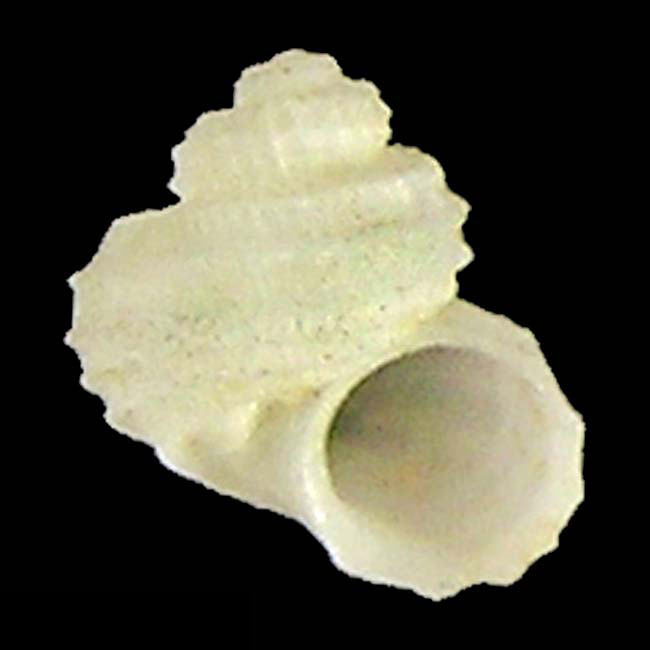
- Shell of Zetela tabakotanii

Scientific classification
- Kingdom: Animalia
- Phylum: Mollusca
- Class: Gastropoda
- Subclass: Vetigastropoda
- Order: Trochida
- Superfamily: Trochoidea
- Family: Solariellidae
- Genus: Zetela
- Species: Z. tabakotanii

Binomial name
- Zetela tabakotanii (Poppe, Tagaro & Dekker, 2006)

Synonyms
- Minolia tabakotanii Poppe, Tagaro & Dekker, 2006 (original combination)

= Zetela tabakotanii =

Species of gastropod

Zetela tabakotanii is a species of sea snail, a marine gastropod mollusk in the family Solariellidae.

== Description ==
The size of the shell attains 2.3 mm (0.091 in).

== Distribution ==
This marine species occurs off the Philippines.
