= Ethminolia sculpta =

Scientific classification
- Kingdom: Animalia
- Phylum: Mollusca
- Class: Gastropoda
- Subclass: Vetigastropoda
- Order: Trochida
- Superfamily: Trochoidea
- Family: Trochidae
- Genus: Ethminolia
- Species: E. sculpta

Binomial name
- Ethminolia sculpta (G.B. Sowerby III, 1897)

Synonyms
- Minolia sculpta (G.B. Sowerby III, 1897); Solariella sculpta G.B. Sowerby III, 1897

Species of gastropod

Ethminolia sculpta is a species of sea snail, a marine gastropod mollusk in the family Trochidae, the top snails.
