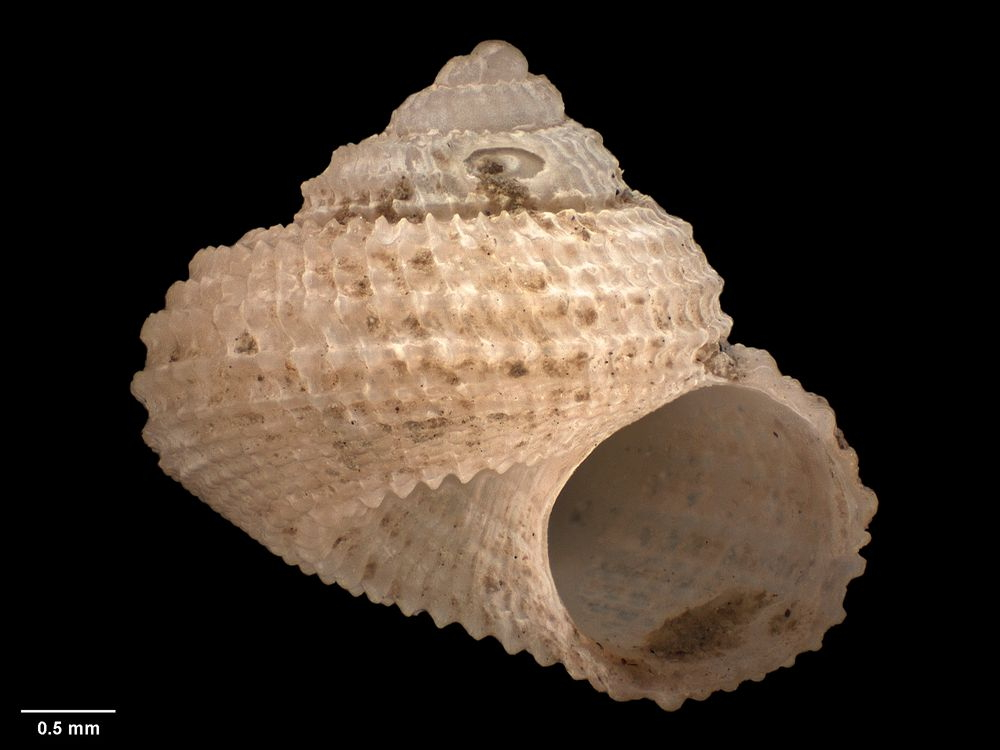
- Shell of Zetela textilis (specimen at the Museum of New Zealand)

Scientific classification
- Kingdom: Animalia
- Phylum: Mollusca
- Class: Gastropoda
- Subclass: Vetigastropoda
- Order: Trochida
- Superfamily: Trochoidea
- Family: Solariellidae
- Genus: Zetela
- Species: Z. textilis

Binomial name
- Zetela textilis (Murdoch & Suter, 1906)

Synonyms
- Minolia textilis Murdoch & Suter, 1906; Solariella textilis (Murdoch & Suter, 1906)

= Zetela textilis =

Species of gastropod

Zetela textilis is a small deepwater species of sea snail, a marine gastropod mollusk in the family Solariellidae.

== Description ==
The length of the shell attains 3.6 mm.

(Original description) The small shell is conoidal, widely umbilicate, fragile and exquisitely sculptured.

Sculpture: There are numerous radiate sharp riblets at regular intervals, the interspaces about twice the breadth of the coribs, crossing over broad rounded spiral cords. On the third whorl there are three spirals, which are supplemented on the following whorl by a faint thread below the suture, and one between the first and second cord. On the body whorl there are two rather inconspicuous spiral threads below the suture, followed to the periphery by five strong spiral cords, the last three more prominent than the others. On the base there are five narrow equal and close-set spiral riblets, and the umbilicus is margined by a stout beaded ridge. All the spiral cords are strongly and sharply beaded by the longitudinal sculpture.

The colour is greyish- white.

The spire is conoidal, with a rounded apex. The protoconch is globular, small, smooth and consists of one whorl. The succeeding whorls show already distinct radiate riblets and spiral threads. The shell contains 4½ whorls, tabulate above, flatly convex below the angulation of the shoulder. The base is slightly convex. The suture is canaliculate. The aperture is subcircular, angled above, white and not nacreous inside. The outer lip is sharp, convex, margined by denticles on the outside, produced by the spiral ridges. The inner lip spreads as a thin callosity over the penultimate whorl and connects the margins. The columella is regularly arched, sharp. The umbilicus is wide, scalar, and margined by a strong beaded cord followed by two spiral ridges, beaded by longitudinal riblets.

== Distribution ==
This marine species is endemic to New Zealand and occurs off the Great Barrier Island and North Island east coast from North Cape to Cape Kidnappers at a depths between 120 mm and 380 m.
