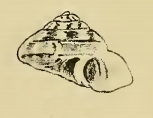
- Original drawing of a shell of Minolia ceraunia

Scientific classification
- Kingdom: Animalia
- Phylum: Mollusca
- Class: Gastropoda
- Subclass: Vetigastropoda
- Order: Trochida
- Superfamily: Trochoidea
- Family: Solariellidae
- Genus: Minolia
- Species: M. ceraunia

Binomial name
- Minolia ceraunia Melvill, 1891

= Minolia ceraunia =

Species of gastropod

Minolia ceraunia is a species of small sea snail, a marine gastropod mollusk in the family Solariellidae.

== Description ==
The height of the shell attains 3 mm and its diameter 5 mm. The white, solid, and deeply umbilicated shell has a depressed shape.

It is slightly transversely furrowed. The shell contains four whorls, with the last one rapidly increasing in size. It is distinguished by regular longitudinal flame markings becoming small, paler, and more zigzagged below the somewhat angled periphery, and all uniting round the umbilicus in a red band.

The aperture is ovate-triangular. The lip is simple. The columellar margin is thickened.

== Distribution ==
This marine species occurs off the coast of Philippines broadly around Indo-West Pacific sea region
