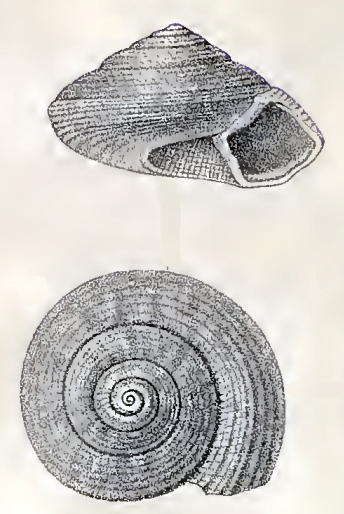
- Original drawing with two views of a shell of Ethminolia ornatissima

Scientific classification
- Kingdom: Animalia
- Phylum: Mollusca
- Class: Gastropoda
- Subclass: Vetigastropoda
- Order: Trochida
- Superfamily: Trochoidea
- Family: Trochidae
- Genus: Ethminolia
- Species: E. ornatissima

Binomial name
- Ethminolia ornatissima (Schepman, 1908)

Synonyms
- Laetifautor ornatissimus (Schepman, 1908); Minolia ornatissima Schepman, 1908; Solariella ornatissima (Schepman, 1908)

= Ethminolia ornatissima =

Species of gastropod

Ethminolia ornatissima is a species of sea snail, a marine gastropod mollusk in the family Solariellidae.

== Description ==
(Original description by M. Schepman) The height of the shell attains 5 mm, its diameter is 6 mm. The thick, depressed shell has a low conoidal spire. It is broadly umbilicate, Its color is greenish-yellow. The top whorls and a band round the umbilicus are brown. The lower whorls contain a row of large brown blotches at the suture. The body whorl has at the periphery a zone, articulated by oblong brown squares, alternating with yellow spaces. The upper and lower surface are more or less distinctly variegated with brown flames and spiral dots of the same color. The 5½ whorls are separated by an impressed suture. They are rather convex and slightly angular by the projection of one of the numerous lirae. These number about 6 on the penultimate whorl, and 7 on the upper part of the body whorl, besides several intermediate, elevated striae, which become very numerous towards the aperture. The body whorl is angular at the periphery. Its convex base has numerous, crowded, elevated striae (partly wanting in a few specimens). The whole surface of the shell is covered with radial striae, crossing the lirae and giving them a beaded appearance, especially near the suture and the umbilicus, where they form regular folds. The umbilicus is pervious and funnel-shaped. Its wall contains flat spiral lirae, crossed by much more crowded, radial, elevated striae, separated by a conspicuous angle from the basal surface. The aperture is subquadrate. Its upper margin is slightly curved, but less so than the basal one. The columellar margin is nearly straight, joining the basal margin with an angle, at the end of the umbilical angle, slightly crenulated by the umbilical lirae. The margins are connected by a thin nacreous layer. The interior of the aperture is nacreous, smooth, and slightly thickened near the margins.

== Distribution ==
This marine species occurs the Philippines, Indonesia, and Queensland; Australia.
