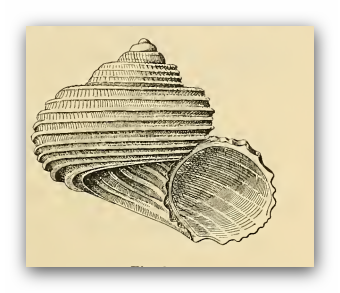
- Original drawing of a shell of Spectamen aratum

Scientific classification
- Kingdom: Animalia
- Phylum: Mollusca
- Class: Gastropoda
- Subclass: Vetigastropoda
- Order: Trochida
- Superfamily: Trochoidea
- Family: Solariellidae
- Genus: Spectamen
- Species: S. aratum

Binomial name
- Spectamen aratum (Hedley, 1903)

Synonyms
- Minolia arata Hedley, 1903 (original combination); Minolops aratus (Hedley, 1903) superseded combination

= Spectamen aratum =

Species of gastropod

Spectamen aratum is a species of sea snail, a marine gastropod mollusk in the family Solariellidae.

== Description ==
The height of the shell attains 7 mm, its diameter 9.5 mm. The widely umbilicate, rather thin shell has a turbinate shape. Its colour is pale yellow, with purple disposed in dots on the shoulder and stripes on the base. The five whorls are tabulate above, angled at the shoulder, thence rounded, last in slight contact with its predecessor. The sutures are impressed.

Sculpture: the flat sutural shelf of the upper whorls is ornamented by fine regular radial riblets. Obliquely descending the slope, these riblets crenulate the upper spirals and gradually vanish on the body whorl into faint irregularly spaced growth lines. On the upper whorls are five spiral cords, between which are smaller threads, in their turn separating still finer lines. The body whorl is encircled by ten strong keels whose interstices are occupied by small and smaller threads as before. The apex is elevated and consists of two small and glossy whorls. The umbilicus is wide and deep, penetrated by five elevated spiral ridges beaded by longitudinal sculpture. The aperture is circular, slightly oblique. The peristome is entire, simple, and sharp, within brilliantly nacreous, nacre edged with a thin brown and a broader yellow non-nacreous margin.

== Distribution ==
This marine species is endemic to Australia and occurs from Queensland to Victoria
