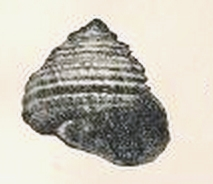
- Original drawing of a shell of Spectamen cinereum

Scientific classification
- Kingdom: Animalia
- Phylum: Mollusca
- Class: Gastropoda
- Subclass: Vetigastropoda
- Order: Trochida
- Superfamily: Trochoidea
- Family: Solariellidae
- Genus: Spectamen
- Species: S. cinereum

Binomial name
- Spectamen cinereum (Preston, 1909)

Synonyms
- Minolia cinerea Preston, 1909 (original combination); Minolops cinereus (Preston, 1909) · unaccepted > superseded combination

= Spectamen cinereum =

Species of gastropod

Spectamen cinereum is a species of sea snail, a marine gastropod mollusk in the family Solariellidae.

== Description ==
The height of the shell attains 6.75 mm, its diameter 6.5 mm. The shining shell has a roundly turbinate shape. It is grey, painted above with closely set transverse bands of greyish brown. The 6½ whorls are flattened above. The sculpture and the colouring is complicated and it is very difficult to give anything like an adequate description. The whorls are sculptured with a number of beaded carinae, increasing to four on the body whorl. The space above these are occupied by two spiral beaded riblets, a third also occurring between the first and second carinae. The sutures are impressed. The base of shell is sculptured with two spiral grooves and a number of very fine spiral striae. It is painted with a zone of fine, closely set cinereous flammules, within which is a second zone almost uniformly of the same colour. The umbilicus is whitish, wide, deep, and bears several small, indistinct, spiral, crenate riblets. The outer margin is surrounded by a coarsely crenulate carina. The columella is somewhat angularly arched above, descending obliquely and terminating rather abruptly. The peristome is acute. The aperture is subquadrate.

== Distribution ==
This marine species is endemic to Australia and occurs off Queensland.
