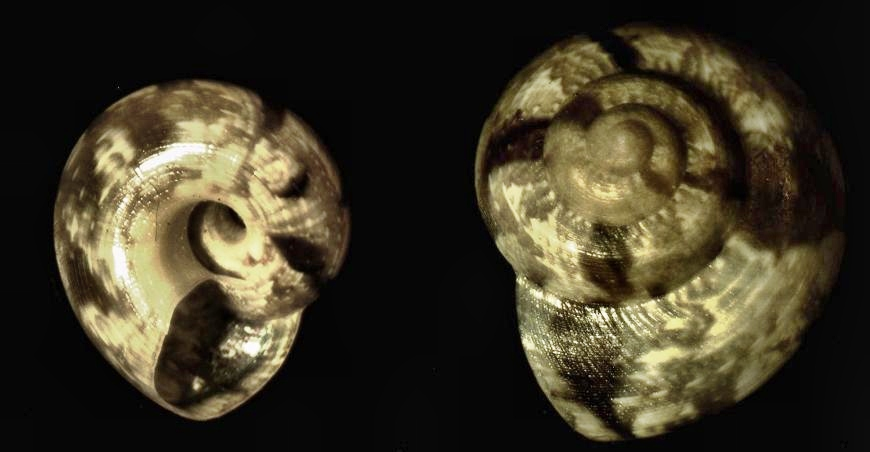
- shells of Ethminolia vitiliginea

Scientific classification
- Kingdom: Animalia
- Phylum: Mollusca
- Class: Gastropoda
- Subclass: Vetigastropoda
- Order: Trochida
- Superfamily: Trochoidea
- Family: Trochidae
- Genus: Ethminolia
- Species: E. vitiliginea

Binomial name
- Ethminolia vitiliginea (Menke, 1843)

Synonyms
- Ethalia tasmanica Tenison-Woods, J.E., 1877; Ethminolia tasmanica Macpherson, J.H. & Gabriel, C.J. 1962; Minolia tasmanica Tenison-Woods, 1876; Minolia tasmanica Pritchard, 1902; Talopena (Ethalia) tasmanica Tenison Woods, 1877; Trochus vitiliginea Menke, 1843

= Ethminolia vitiliginea =

Species of gastropod

Ethminolia vitiliginea, common name the depressed top shell, is a species of sea snail, a marine gastropod mollusk in the family Trochidae, the top snails.

== Description ==
The size of an adult shell varies between 7 mm and 11 mm. The broadly umbilicate shell is depressed and has a low-conoidal spire. It is thin, scarcely shining, and opaque whitish. The upper surface shows radiating maculations of purplish or olive-brown. The base of the shell is marbled with the same colours. The minute apex is acute. The sutures are well impressed. The approximately 5 1/2 whorls are convex, those of the spire subangular in the middle, flattened below the suture, giving the spire a terraced appearance. The body whorl is subcylindrical, obtusely subangular at the periphery, convex beneath. The surface all over is encircled by delicate spiral elevated striae, and around the umbilicus decussated by growth lines. The aperture is subcircular, a trifle modified by the contact of the penultimate whorl. The margins are all thin and simple. The umbilicus is about 1/4 the diameter of base, opaque white within, and longitudinally striated.

The tubular whorls, rounded save for a flattened area below the suture, and keel-less except for the carina banding that area, will discriminate this shell from many species. Other marks are the delicate spiral striation, wide umbilicus, and broad radiating maculations of the upper surface.

== Distribution ==
This marine species is endemic to Australia and occurs from the Bass Strait to Western Australia.
