= Spectamen gertruda =

Scientific classification (disputed)
- Kingdom: Animalia
- Phylum: Mollusca
- Class: Gastropoda
- Subclass: Vetigastropoda
- Order: Trochida
- Superfamily: Trochoidea
- Family: Solariellidae
- Genus: Spectamen
- Species: S. gertruda

Binomial name
- Spectamen gertruda (Iredale, 1936)

Synonyms
- Minolia gertruda Iredale, 1936; Minolops gertruda Iredale, 1936 superseded combination

Species of gastropod

Spectamen gertruda, common name the coral red top shell, is a species of sea snail, a marine gastropod mollusk in the family Solariellidae.

== Description ==
The size of the shell attains 9 mm.

== Distribution ==
This marine species is endemic to Australia and occurs off New South Wales
