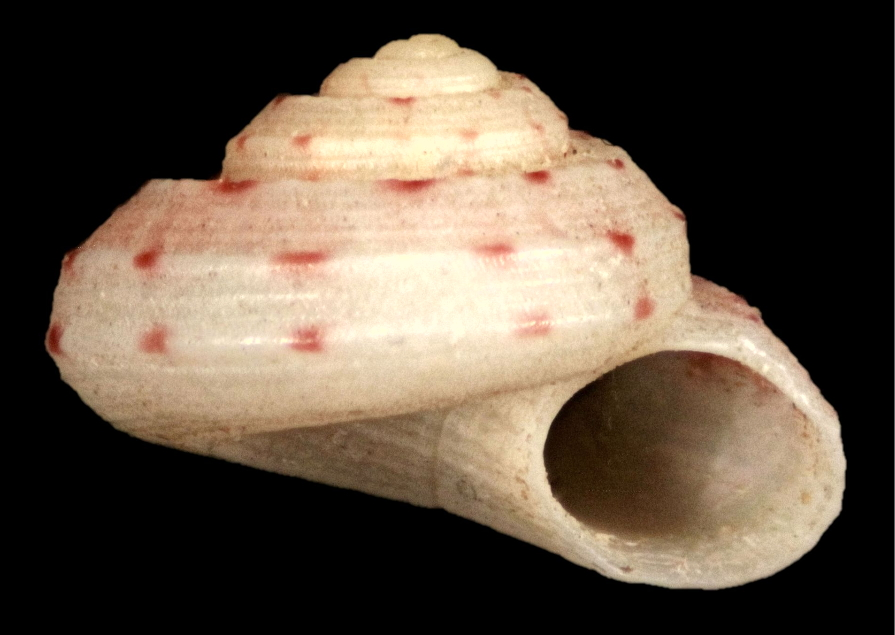
- shell of Spectamen pulcherrimum (specimen at Naturalis Biodiversity Center)

Scientific classification
- Kingdom: Animalia
- Phylum: Mollusca
- Class: Gastropoda
- Subclass: Vetigastropoda
- Order: Trochida
- Superfamily: Trochoidea
- Family: Solariellidae
- Genus: Spectamen
- Species: S. pulcherrimum

Binomial name
- Spectamen pulcherrimum (Angas, 1869)

Synonyms
- Minolia emendata Iredale, 1924 junior subjective synonym; Minolia pulcherrima Angas, 1869; Minolia pulcherrima emendata Iredale, 1924 (junior subjective synonym); Minolops emendatus (Iredale, 1924) junior subjective synonym; Minolops pulcherrimus (Angas, 1869) superseded combination; Minolops pulcherrimus emendatus (Iredale, 1924) junior subjective synonym; Minolops pulcherrimus pulcherrima (Angas, 1869) superseded rank; Minolops rosulentus (R. B. Watson, 1883) junior subjective synonym; Solarium (Torinia) rosulentum R. B. Watson, 1883 junior subjective synonym; Solarium rosulentum R. B. Watson, 1883 junior subjective synonym

= Spectamen pulcherrimum =

Species of gastropod

Spectamen pulcherrimum is a species of sea snail, a marine gastropod mollusk in the family Solariellidae.

== Description ==
The height of the shell attains 5 mm, its diameter 8 mm. The rather solid shell has a depressedly conical shape. It is transversely finely ridged, with two or three broader ridges forming keels. The interstices are crossed everywhere with very fine close-set oblique striae. Its color is pinkish or yellowish white stained on the body whorl with bright rose, and spotted on the keels with deep purple lake. The apex is buff. The six whorls are angularly convex. The sutures are broadly and flatly channelled. The body whorl is tricarinate, beneath white and rounded. The wide umbilicus is perspective and crenate within. The aperture is perfectly circular, pearly inside. The peristome is continuous. The thin lips are simple.

== Distribution ==
This marine species is endemic to Australia and occurs off New South Wales.
