= List of Calliostoma species =

As of December 2022, the following species of molluscs are recognised in the genus Calliostoma.

== A ==
- Calliostoma adelae Schwengel, 1951
- Calliostoma admirandum E. A. Smith, 1906
- Calliostoma adspersum Philippi, 1851
- Calliostoma aequisculptum P. P. Carpenter, 1865
- Calliostoma africanum Bartsch, 1915
- Calliostoma agalma Schwengel, 1942;
- Calliostoma agrigentinum Coen, 1936
- Calliostoma aikeni Lussi, 2014
- Calliostoma alboregium M. Azuma, 1961
- Calliostoma alisi B. A. Marshall, 1995
- Calliostoma allporti Tenison Woods, 1876
- Calliostoma altena Knudsen, 1970
- † Calliostoma alternatum Millet, 1865
- Calliostoma alternum Quinn, 1992
- Calliostoma amamiense Sakurai, 1994
- Calliostoma anderssoni Strebel, 1908
- Calliostoma angolense Boyer, 2007
- Calliostoma annulatum Lightfoot, 1786
- Calliostoma anseeuwi Poppe, Tagaro & H. Dekker, 2006
- Calliostoma antonii F. C. L. Koch, 1843
- Calliostoma apicinum Dall, 1881
- Calliostoma apicisuperi S.-I Huang & I-F. Fu, 2019
- Calliostoma aporia Vilvens, 2009
- Calliostoma aprosceptum Vilvens, 2009
- Calliostoma argentum Quinn, 1992
- Calliostoma arx Vilvens, 2005
- Calliostoma aulicum Quinn, 1992
- Calliostoma aurora Dall, 1888
- Calliostoma axelolssoni Quinn, 1992

== B ==
- Calliostoma babelicum Habe, 1961
- † Calliostoma baccatum Millet, 1865
- Calliostoma bairdii A. E. Verrill & S. Smith, 1880
- Calliostoma barbouri Clench & Aguayo, 1946
- Calliostoma basulense Poppe, Tagaro & Vilvens, 2014
- Calliostoma belauense Okutani & Kurata, 1998
- Calliostoma bellatrix Willan, 2002
- Calliostoma benedicti Dall, 1889
- Calliostoma bermudense Quinn, 1992
- † Calliostoma biangulatum Landau, Van Dingenen & Ceulemans, 2017
- Calliostoma bigelowi Clench & Aguayo, 1938
- † Calliostoma bituberculatum Cossmann & Pissarro, 1905
- Calliostoma bonita A. M. Strong, G. D. Hanna & Hertlein, 1933
- † Calliostoma boscianum Brongniart, 1823
- † Calliostoma brugnonei Monterosato, 1890
- Calliostoma brunneopictum Quinn, 1992
- Calliostoma brunneum Dall, 1881
- Calliostoma bullatum Philippi, 1844
- Calliostoma bullisi Clench & R. D. Turner, 1960

== C ==
- Calliostoma canaliculatum Sasao & Habe, 1973
- Calliostoma canaliculatum Lightfoot, 1786
- Calliostoma carcellesi Clench & Aguayo, 1940
- Calliostoma caribbechinatum Landau, Van Dingenen & Ceulemans, 2017
- Calliostoma caroli Dautzenberg, 1927
- Calliostoma cheni Z.-Z. Dong, 2002
- Calliostoma chinoi Poppe, Tagaro & H. Dekker, 2006
- Calliostoma chlorum Vilvens, 2005
- Calliostoma chuni E. von Martens, 1904
- Calliostoma cinctellum Dall, 1889
- Calliostoma circumcinctum Dall, 1881
- Calliostoma circus Barnard, 1969
- Calliostoma cleopatra Locard, 1896
- Calliostoma cnidophilum Quinn, 1992
- Calliostoma cochlias Vilvens, 2009
- Calliostoma columnarium Hedley & May, 1908
- Calliostoma connyae Poppe, Tagaro & Vilvens, 2014
- Calliostoma consimile E. A. Smith, 1881
- † Calliostoma contractum Millet, 1865
- Calliostoma conulus Linnaeus, 1758
- Calliostoma coppingeri E. A. Smith, 1880
- Calliostoma coronatum Quinn, 1992
- Calliostoma crassicostatum Schepman, 1908
- Calliostoma crossleyae E. A. Smith, 1910
- Calliostoma cubense Quinn, 1992
- Calliostoma cyrtoida Gofas & Hoffman, 2020

== D ==
- Calliostoma debile Quinn, 1992
- Calliostoma decapitatum Wilckens, 1922 †
- Calliostoma decipiens Guppy, 1867
- Calliostoma dedonderi Vilvens, 2000
- Calliostoma delonguevilleae Vilvens & Swinnen, 2017
- Calliostoma dentatum Quinn, 1992
- Calliostoma depictum Dall, 1927
- Calliostoma diaphoros Vilvens, 2009
- Calliostoma doncorni Kay, 1979
- Calliostoma duricastellum Melvill, 1898

== E ==
- Calliostoma echinatum Dall, 1881
- Calliostoma elegantulum A. Adams, 1853
- Calliostoma emmanueli Vilvens, 2000
- Calliostoma escondidum Poppe, Tagaro & Vilvens, 2014
- Calliostoma euglyptum A. Adams, 1855
- Calliostoma eximium Reeve, 1843

== F ==
- Calliostoma fascinans Schwengel & T. L. McGinty, 1942
- Calliostoma fernandesi Rolán & Monteiro, 2006
- Calliostoma fernandezi Princz, 1978
- Calliostoma filiareginae Sakurai, 1994
- Calliostoma fonki Philippi, 1860
- Calliostoma formosense E. A. Smith, 1907
- † Calliostoma formosissimum G. Seguenza, 1876
- Calliostoma freiwaldi Gofas & Hoffman, 2020
- Calliostoma fucosum Quinn, 1992
- Calliostoma funiculare Melvill, 1897
- Calliostoma funiculatum Ardovini, 2011

== G ==
- Calliostoma galea Sakurai, 1994
- Calliostoma gavaldoni Vilvens, 2009
- Calliostoma gemmosum Reeve, 1842
- Calliostoma gemmulatum P. P. Carpenter, 1864
- Calliostoma gibbuliforme Landau, Van Dingenen & Ceulemans, 2017 †
- Calliostoma gloriosum Dall, 1871
- Calliostoma gordanum J. H. McLean, 1970
- Calliostoma granulatum Born, 1778
- † Calliostoma gratiosum Millet, 1865
- Calliostoma grimaldii Dautzenberg & H. Fischer, 1896
- Calliostoma grohi Stratmann & Stahlschmidt, 2007
- Calliostoma gualterianum Philippi, 1848
- Calliostoma gubbiolii Nofroni, 1984
- Calliostoma guerreroense Tuskes & McGowan-Tuskes, 2019
- Calliostoma guesti Quinn, 1992
- Calliostoma guphili Poppe, 2004

== H ==
- Calliostoma haapaiense Vilvens, 2014
- Calliostoma halibrectum Dall, 1927
- Calliostoma hassler Clench & Aguayo, 1939
- Calliostoma hayamanum Kuroda & Habe, 1971
- Calliostoma hayashii Shikama, 1977
- Calliostoma hedleyi Pritchard & Gatliff, 1902
- Calliostoma hematomenon Vilvens, 2014
- Calliostoma hendersoni Dall, 1927
- Calliostoma herberti Vilvens, 2014
- Calliostoma hernandezi Rubio & Gubbioli, 1993
- Calliostoma heros B. A. Marshall, 1995
- Calliostoma heugteni Vilvens & Swinnen, 2003
- Calliostoma hexalyssion Vilvens, 2009
- Calliostoma hilare Quinn, 1992
- Calliostoma hirondellei Dautzenberg & H. Fischer, 1896
- Calliostoma hirtum Quinn, 1992
- Calliostoma houarti Vilvens, 2000
- Calliostoma hungi S.-I Huang & I-F. Fu, 2019

== I ==
- Calliostoma imperiale Kosuge, 1979
- Calliostoma indiana Dall, 1889
- Calliostoma insigne Olsson, 1971
- Calliostoma irerense Harzhauser, 2017 †
- Calliostoma iridescens G. B. Sowerby III, 1903
- Calliostoma iridium Dall, 1896
- Calliostoma iris Kuroda & Habe, 1961
- Calliostoma irisans Strebel, 1905
- Calliostoma iwamotoi Ikebe, 1942
- Calliostoma iwaotakii Azuma, 1961

== J ==
- Calliostoma jackelynae Bozzetti, 1997
- Calliostoma jacquelinae J. H. McLean, 1970
- Calliostoma javanicum Lamarck, 1822
- Calliostoma jeanneae Clench & R. D. Turner, 1960
- Calliostoma joanneae Olsson, 1971
- Calliostoma jucundum Gould, 1849
- Calliostoma jujubinum Gmelin, 1791

== K ==
- Calliostoma kampsa Dall, 1927
- Calliostoma katoi Sakurai, 1994
- Calliostoma katorii Poppe, Tagaro & Goto, 2018
- Calliostoma katsunakamai Kosuge, 1998
- Calliostoma keenae J. H. McLean, 1970
- † Calliostoma kleppi S. N. Nielsen, Frassinetti & Bandel, 2004
- Calliostoma koma Shikama & Habe, 1965
- Calliostoma kurodai M. Azuma, 1975

== L ==
- † Calliostoma lamellatum Landau, Van Dingenen & Ceulemans, 2017
- Calliostoma laugieri Payraudeau, 1826
- Calliostoma layardi G. B. Sowerby III, 1897
- Calliostoma leanum C. B. Adams, 1852
- Calliostoma legrandi Tenison Woods, 1876
- Calliostoma leptophyma Dautzenberg & H. Fischer, 1896
- Calliostoma lequementorum Poppe & Tagaro, 2019
- Calliostoma lesporti Pacaud, 2017 †
- Calliostoma levibasis Kuroda & Habe, 1971
- Calliostoma ligatum Gould, 1849
- Calliostoma lithocolletum Dautzenberg, 1925
- Calliostoma lividum Dautzenberg, 1927
- Calliostoma lui S.-I Huang & I-F. Fu, 2019

== M ==
- Calliostoma madagascarense Vilvens, Nolf & Verstraeten, 2004
- Calliostoma madatechnema Vilvens, 2014
- Calliostoma maekawai Poppe, Tagaro & Goto, 2018
- Calliostoma magaldii Caldini & Prado, 1998
- † Calliostoma mapucherum S. N. Nielsen, Frassinetti & Bandel, 2004
- Calliostoma margaretae R. Aiken & Seccombe, 2019
- Calliostoma margaritissimum Habe & Okutani, 1968
- Calliostoma mariae Poppe, Tagaro & H. Dekker, 2006
- Calliostoma marionae Dall, 1906
- Calliostoma marisflavi S.-I Huang & I-F. Fu, 2015
- Calliostoma marshalli H. N. Lowe, 1935
- Calliostoma maurolici G. Seguenza, 1876
- Calliostoma mcleani Shasky & G. B. Campbell, 1964
- Calliostoma melliferum Cavallari & Simone, 2018
- Calliostoma mesemorinon Vilvens, 2014
- Calliostoma metabolicum Vilvens, 2005
- † Calliostoma michaeli Landau, Van Dingenen & Ceulemans, 2017
- † Calliostoma microgemmatum Landau, Van Dingenen & Ceulemans, 2017
- Calliostoma mikikoae Kosuge & Oh-Ishi, 1970
- Calliostoma militare Ihering, 1907
- † Calliostoma milletechinatum Landau, Ceulemans & Van Dingenen, 2018
- † Calliostoma milletigranum Landau, Van Dingenen & Ceulemans, 2017
- Calliostoma milneedwardsi Locard, 1898
- † Calliostoma miotorulosum Landau, Van Dingenen & Ceulemans, 2017
- † Calliostoma miotumidum Landau, Van Dingenen & Ceulemans, 2017
- Calliostoma modestulum Strebel, 1908
- Calliostoma moebiusi Strebel, 1905
- † Calliostoma mohtatae Harzhauser, 2017
- Calliostoma moscatellii Quinn, 1992

== N ==
- Calliostoma nakamigawai Sakurai, 1994
- Calliostoma nanshaense Z.-Z. Dong, 2002
- Calliostoma nepheloide Dall, 1913
- Calliostoma nordenskjoldi Strebel, 1908
- Calliostoma normani Dautzenberg & H. Fischer, 1897
- Calliostoma nudiusculum K. E. Martens, 1881
- Calliostoma nudum Philippi, 1845

== O ==
- Calliostoma occidentale Mighels & C. B. Adams, 1842
- Calliostoma ocellatum Reeve, 1863
- Calliostoma opalinum Kuroda & Habe, 1971
- † Calliostoma opisthostenum Fontannes, 1880
- Calliostoma oregon Clench & R. D. Turner, 1960
- Calliostoma orion Dall, 1889
- Calliostoma ornatum Lamarck, 1822 (accepted > unreplaced junior homonym)
- Calliostoma otukai Ikebe, 1942

== P ==
- † Calliostoma pagodulum Millet, 1865
- Calliostoma palmeri Dall, 1871
- Calliostoma parvajuba Vilvens, 2014
- Calliostoma paucicostatum Kosuge, 1984
- Calliostoma peregrinum B. A. Marshall, 1995
- Calliostoma perfragile G. B. Sowerby III, 1903
- Calliostoma pertinax B. A. Marshall, 1995
- Calliostoma philippei Poppe, 2004
- Calliostoma picturatum A. Adams, 1853
- Calliostoma pillsburyae Olsson, 1971
- † Calliostoma planospirum Millet, 1865
- Calliostoma platinum Dall, 1890
- Calliostoma polysarkon Vilvens, 2014
- Calliostoma poppei Vilvens, 2000
- † Calliostoma praecedens Koenen, 1882
- † Calliostoma presselierense Landau, Van Dingenen & Ceulemans, 2017
- Calliostoma problematicum Kuroda & Habe, 1971
- Calliostoma psyche Dall, 1888
- Calliostoma pulchrum C. B. Adams, 1850
- Calliostoma purpureum Quinn, 1992
- Calliostoma pyrron Vilvens, 2014

== Q ==
- Calliostoma quadricolor Schepman, 1908
- † Calliostoma quaggaoides Landau, Van Dingenen & Ceulemans, 2017

== R ==
- Calliostoma rema A. M. Strong, G. D. Hanna & Hertlein, 1933
- Calliostoma roseolum Dall, 1881
- Calliostoma rosewateri Clench & R. D. Turner, 1960
- Calliostoma rota Quinn, 1992
- Calliostoma rubroscalptum Y.-C. Lee & W.-L. Wu, 1998
- Calliostoma rude Quinn, 1992
- Calliostoma rufomaculatum Schepman, 1908

== S ==
- Calliostoma sagamiense Ishida & Uchida, 1977
- Calliostoma sakashitai Sakurai, 1994
- Calliostoma sanjaimense J. H. McLean, 1970
- Calliostoma santacruzanum J. H. McLean, 1970
- Calliostoma sapidum Dall, 1881
- Calliostoma sarcodum Dall, 1927
- Calliostoma sayanum Dall, 1889
- Calliostoma scalenum Quinn, 1992
- Calliostoma schroederi Clench & Aguayo, 1938
- Calliostoma scobinatum Reeve, 1863
- Calliostoma scotti Kilburn, 1973
- Calliostoma scurra Quinn, 1992
- † Calliostoma scutiforme Sacco, 1896
- Calliostoma semisuave Quinn, 1992
- Calliostoma serratulum Quinn, 1992
- Calliostoma shawni Poppe & Tagarao, 2020
- Calliostoma shinagawaense Tokunaga, 1906
- Calliostoma simodense Ikebe, 1942
- Calliostoma simplex Schepman, 1908
- Calliostoma soyoae Ikebe, 1942
- Calliostoma spesa J.-L. Zhang, P. Wei & S.-P. Zhang, 2018
- † Calliostoma spinosum Landau, Van Dingenen & Ceulemans, 2017
- Calliostoma springeri Clench & R. D. Turner, 1960
- Calliostoma stephanephorum Watson, 1886
- Calliostoma stirophorum R. B. Watson, 1879
- Calliostoma strobilos Vilvens, 2005
- † Calliostoma sturi R. Hoernes, 1875
- Calliostoma subalboroseum Vilvens, 2014
- † Calliostoma subexcavatum S. V. Wood, 1848
- Calliostoma sublaeve E. A. Smith, 1895
- Calliostoma suduirauti Bozzetti, 1997
- Calliostoma sugitanii Sakurai, 1994
- Calliostoma supragranosum P. P. Carpenter, 1864
- Calliostoma swinneni Poppe, Tagaro & H. Dekker, 2006
- Calliostoma syungokannoi Kosuge, 1998

== T ==
- Calliostoma takaseanum Okutani, 1972
- Calliostoma takujii Kosuge, 1986
- Calliostoma tampaense Conrad, 1846
- † Calliostoma tauromiliare Sacco, 1896
- Calliostoma tenebrosum Quinn, 1992
- Calliostoma textor Vilvens, 2014
- Calliostoma thachi Alf & Stratmann, 2007
- Calliostoma thrincoma Melvill & Standen, 1903
- Calliostoma ticaonicum A. Adams, 1853
- Calliostoma tittarium Dall, 1927
- Calliostoma tornatum Röding, 1798
- Calliostoma torrei Clench & Aguayo, 1940
- Calliostoma trachystum Dall, 1927
- Calliostoma tranquebaricum Röding, 1798
- Calliostoma tricolor Gabb, 1865
- Calliostoma triporcatum Locard, 1898
- Calliostoma tropis Vilvens, 2009
- Calliostoma trotini Poppe, Tagaro & H. Dekker, 2006
- Calliostoma tsuchiyai Kuroda & Habe, 1971
- Calliostoma tumidosolidum Vilvens, 2014
- Calliostoma tupinamba Dornellas, 2012
- Calliostoma turbinum Dall, 1896

== U ==
- † Calliostoma umbellum Millet, 1865
- Calliostoma uranipponense Okutani, 1969

== V ==
- Calliostoma valkuri Cavallari, Salvador, Dornellas & Simone, 2019
- Calliostoma variegatum P. P. Carpenter, 1864
- Calliostoma vaubanoides Vilvens, 2014
- Calliostoma veleroae J. H. McLean, 1970
- Calliostoma venustum Dunker, 1871
- † Calliostoma verrucosum Landau, Van Dingenen & Ceulemans, 2017
- † Calliostoma vibrayanum Dollfus & Dautzenberg, 1886
- Calliostoma vicdani Kosuge, 1984
- Calliostoma vilvensi Poppe, 2004
- Calliostoma virescens Coen, 1933
- † Calliostoma virginicum Conrad, 1875
- Calliostoma virgo Schepman, 1908
- Calliostoma viscardii Quinn, 1992

== X ==
- Calliostoma xanthos B. A. Marshall, 1995
- Calliostoma xylocinnamomum Vilvens, 2005

== Y ==
- Calliostoma yingchenae S.-I Huang & I-F. Fu, 2022
- Calliostoma yucatecanum Dall, 1881

== Z ==
- Calliostoma zietzi Verco, 1905
- Calliostoma zizyphinum Linnaeus, 1758
