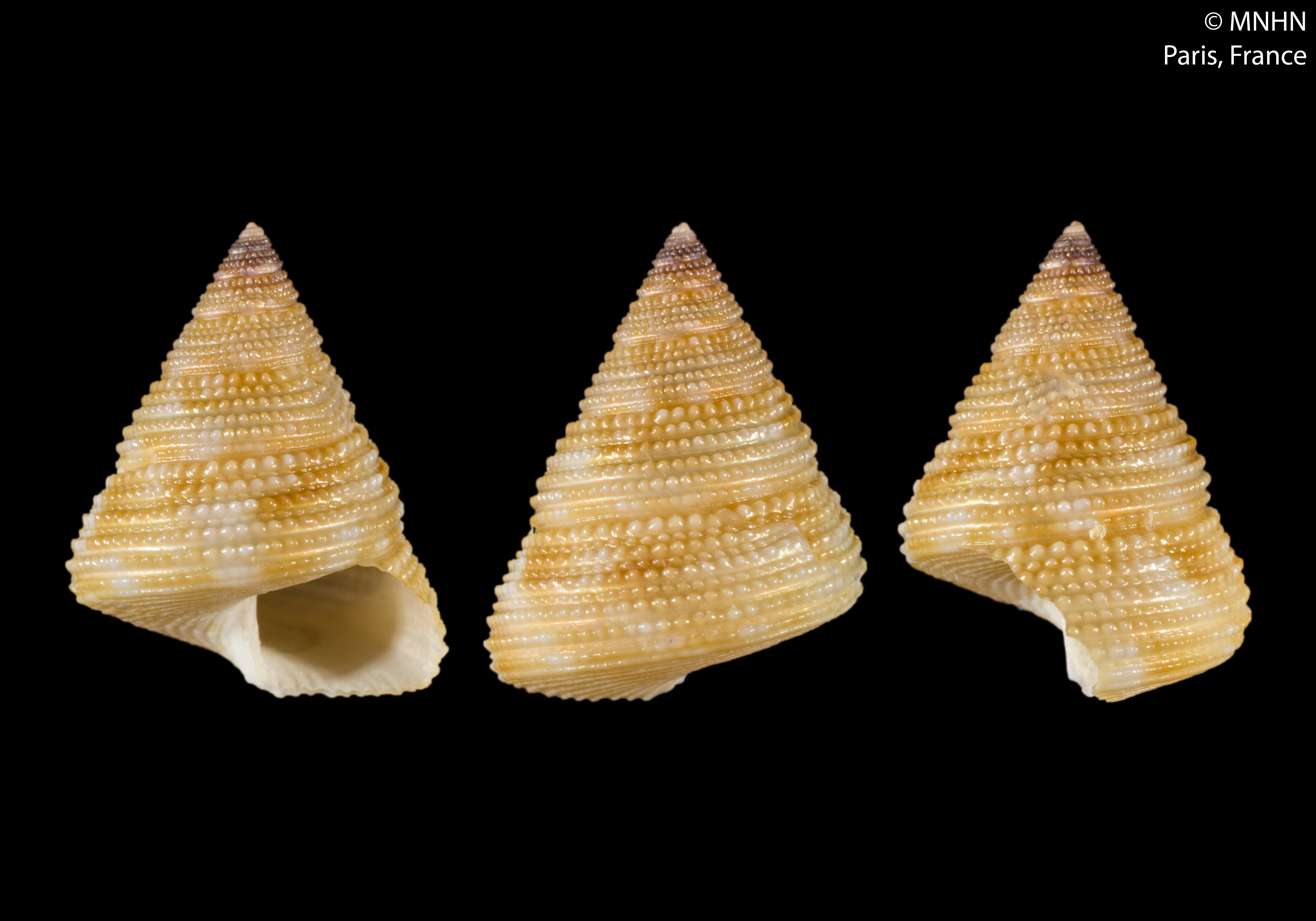
- Shell of Calliostoma chlorum (holotype at MNHN, Paris)

Scientific classification
- Kingdom: Animalia
- Phylum: Mollusca
- Class: Gastropoda
- Subclass: Vetigastropoda
- Order: Trochida
- Family: Calliostomatidae
- Genus: Calliostoma
- Species: C. chlorum

Binomial name
- Calliostoma chlorum Vilvens, 2005

= Calliostoma chlorum =

Species of gastropod

Calliostoma chlorum is a species of sea snail, a marine gastropod mollusk in the family Calliostomatidae.

Some authors place this taxon in the subgenus Calliostoma (Fautor)

== Description ==
The height of the shell attains 13 mm.

== Distribution ==
This species occurs in the Pacific Ocean off the Fiji Islands.
