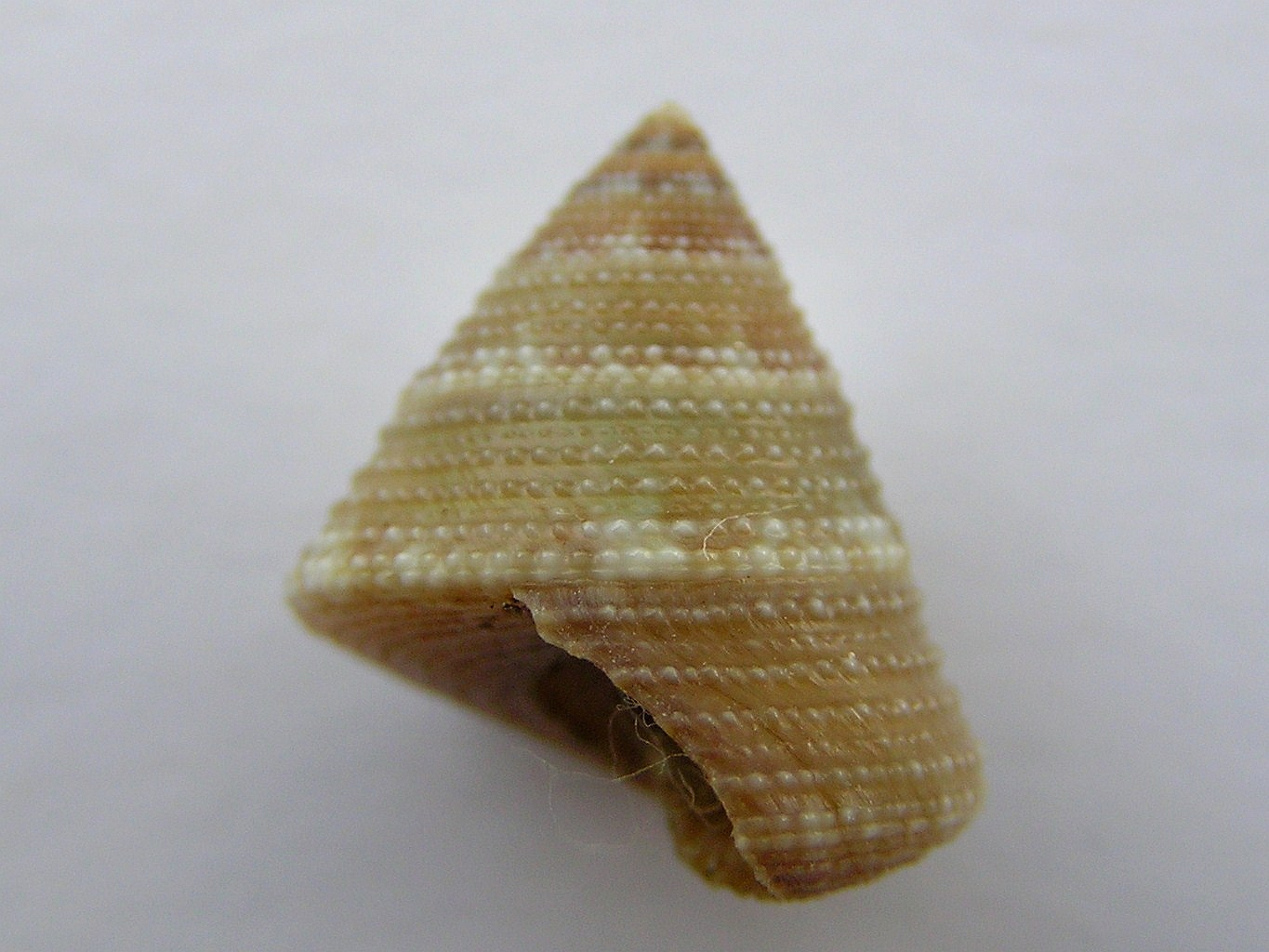
- Side view of a shell of Calliostoma adelae

Conservation status
- Imperiled (NatureServe)

Scientific classification
- Kingdom: Animalia
- Phylum: Mollusca
- Class: Gastropoda
- Subclass: Vetigastropoda
- Order: Trochida
- Family: Calliostomatidae
- Genus: Calliostoma
- Species: C. adelae

Binomial name
- Calliostoma adelae Schwengel, 1951

Synonyms
- Calliostoma (Eutrochus) jujubinum adelae Schwengel, 1951

= Calliostoma adelae =

Species of gastropod

Calliostoma adelae, common name Adele's top shell, is a species of sea snail, a marine gastropod mollusk in the family Calliostomatidae.

== Distribution ==
This species occurs in the Gulf of Mexico, off Florida and the Florida Keys; in the Atlantic Ocean off Brazil.

== Description ==
The maximum recorded shell length is 45 mm.

== Habitat ==
Minimum recorded depth is 2 m. Maximum recorded depth is 24 m.
