= Calliostoma paucicostatum =

Scientific classification
- Kingdom: Animalia
- Phylum: Mollusca
- Class: Gastropoda
- Subclass: Vetigastropoda
- Order: Trochida
- Family: Calliostomatidae
- Genus: Calliostoma
- Species: C. paucicostatum

Binomial name
- Calliostoma paucicostatum Kosuge, 1984

Synonyms
- Calliostoma (Benthastelena) paucicostatum Kosuge, 1984

Species of gastropod

Calliostoma paucicostatum is a species of sea snail, a marine gastropod mollusk in the family Calliostomatidae.

Some authors place this taxon in the subgenus Calliostoma (Benthastelena)

== Description ==
The size of the shell varies between 13 mm and 20 mm.

== Distribution ==
This marine species occurs off the Philippines.
