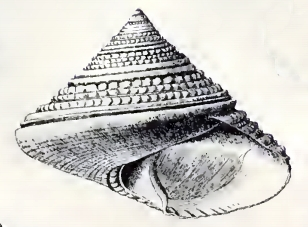
- Original drawing with an apertural view of a shell of Calliostoma benedicti

Scientific classification
- Kingdom: Animalia
- Phylum: Mollusca
- Class: Gastropoda
- Subclass: Vetigastropoda
- Order: Trochida
- Family: Calliostomatidae
- Genus: Calliostoma
- Species: C. benedicti

Binomial name
- Calliostoma benedicti Dall, 1889

Synonyms
- Calliostoma (Eutrochus) benedicti Dall, 1889

= Calliostoma benedicti =

Species of gastropod

Calliostoma benedicti, common name Springer's top shell, is a species of sea snail, a marine gastropod mollusk in the family Calliostomatidae.

The species was named after Mr. J.S. Benedict, formerly naturalist of the Albatross party,

== Description ==
(Original description by W.H. Dall) The size of the shell varies between 23 mm and 39 mm. The depressed, umbilicated shell has an acute apex and a slightly concave outline. It is polished, straw-colored and lineated with red brown and pale pink. Its base is convex, slightly flattened. The periphery is rounded. The nucleus is minute, apparently dextral. The spire contain seven or more whorls. The umbilicus is deep and narrow, with flexuous walls excavated near the carina, which is marginated with an opaque white band. The spiral sculpture begins at the umbilicus. Outside the carina, which is simple, there are two strong broad subnodulous spirals separated by a deep line, then fourteen or more equal smooth flattish spirals with narrower interspaces and obsolete spiral striulae here and there. Then follows a smooth or slightly striate peripheral space. All the preceding are straw-colored. Above the periphery one can see two pink and one straw-colored large smooth and rounded spirals, one smaller smooth one, then three large and two intercalary smaller nodulous spirals separated from the suture by a narrow smooth space. The interspaces are brown, the elevations straw-colored. The early whorls have two or three smooth and one or two nodulous spirals, the former remain constant with growth, the latter increase in number. The radiating sculpture consists of flexuous incremental lines, hardly visible. The rounded aperture is squarish. The white columella is thin, concave, with a small notch at its base.

The yellow operculum is multispiral, translucent, and polished.

== Distribution ==
This species occurs in the Gulf of Mexico and in the Atlantic Ocean off North Carolina, USA, at a depth of about 360 m.

== Description ==
The maximum recorded shell length is 18 millimetres (0.71 in).

== Habitat ==
Minimum recorded depth is 366 metres (1,201 ft). Maximum recorded depth is 366 m (1,201 ft).
