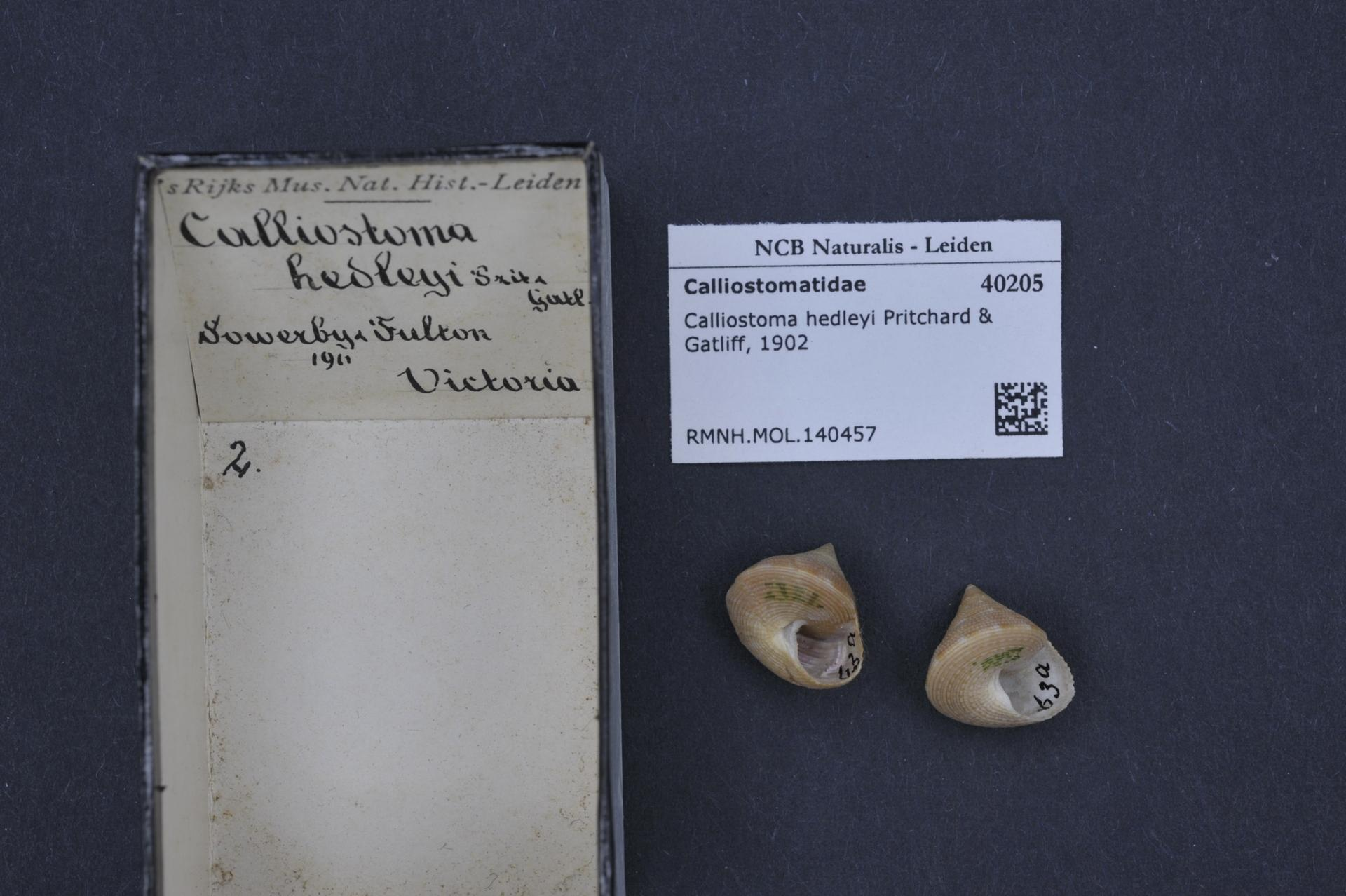

Scientific classification
- Kingdom: Animalia
- Phylum: Mollusca
- Class: Gastropoda
- Subclass: Vetigastropoda
- Order: Trochida
- Family: Calliostomatidae
- Genus: Calliostoma
- Species: C. hedleyi

Binomial name
- Calliostoma hedleyi Pritchard & Gatliff, 1902

= Calliostoma hedleyi =

Species of gastropod

Calliostoma hedleyi is a species of sea snail, a marine gastropod mollusk in the family Calliostomatidae.

Some authors place this taxon in the subgenus Calliostoma (Fautor).

== Description ==
The size of the shell varies between 7 mm and 17 mm.

== Distribution ==
This marine species occurs in Australian waters off Victoria, Tasmania, and Western Australia.
