= Calliostoma alboregium =

Scientific classification
- Kingdom: Animalia
- Phylum: Mollusca
- Class: Gastropoda
- Subclass: Vetigastropoda
- Order: Trochida
- Family: Calliostomatidae
- Genus: Calliostoma
- Species: C. alboregium

Binomial name
- Calliostoma alboregium Azuma, 1961

Synonyms
- Calliostoma (Kombologian) alboregium (Azuma, M., 1961)

Species of gastropod

Calliostoma alboregium is a species of sea snail, a marine gastropod mollusk in the family Calliostomatidae.

Some authors place this taxon in the subgenus Calliostoma (Tristichotrochus)

== Distribution ==
This marine species occurs in the Indo-Pacific.
