= Calliostoma syungokannoi =

Scientific classification
- Kingdom: Animalia
- Phylum: Mollusca
- Class: Gastropoda
- Subclass: Vetigastropoda
- Order: Trochida
- Family: Calliostomatidae
- Genus: Calliostoma
- Species: C. syungokannoi

Binomial name
- Calliostoma syungokannoi Kosuge, 1998

Synonyms
- Calliostoma (Kombologion) syungokannoi Kosuge, 1998

Species of gastropod

Calliostoma syungokannoi is a species of sea snail, a marine gastropod mollusk in the family Calliostomatidae.

Some authors place this taxon in the subgenus Calliostoma (Kombologion).

== Distribution ==
This species occurs in the Andaman Sea.
