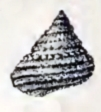
- Drawing of a shell of Calliostoma elegantulum

Scientific classification
- Kingdom: Animalia
- Phylum: Mollusca
- Class: Gastropoda
- Subclass: Vetigastropoda
- Order: Trochida
- Family: Calliostomatidae
- Genus: Calliostoma
- Species: C. elegantulum

Binomial name
- Calliostoma elegantulum (A. Adams, 1853)

Synonyms
- Ziziphinus elegantulus A. Adams, 1853

= Calliostoma elegantulum =

Species of gastropod

Calliostoma elegantulum is a species of sea snail, a marine gastropod mollusk in the family Calliostomatidae.

== Description ==
The buff, imperforate shell has a conical shape. The whorls are plane, encircled by distant elevated violet beaded lines, alternately smaller, the interstices longitudinally striate. The base of the shell is nearly plane, ornamented with 4 violet cinguli. The aperture is subquadrate and white inside. The columella is subtruncate at its base.
