= Calliostoma magaldii =

Scientific classification
- Kingdom: Animalia
- Phylum: Mollusca
- Class: Gastropoda
- Subclass: Vetigastropoda
- Order: Trochida
- Family: Calliostomatidae
- Genus: Calliostoma
- Species: C. magaldii

Binomial name
- Calliostoma magaldii Caldini & Prado, 1998

Species of gastropod

Calliostoma magaldii is a species of sea snail, a marine gastropod mollusk in the family Calliostomatidae.

== Description ==
The height of the shell attains 12 mm.

== Distribution ==
This species occurs in the Atlantic Ocean off Argentina at depths between 70 m and 100 m.
