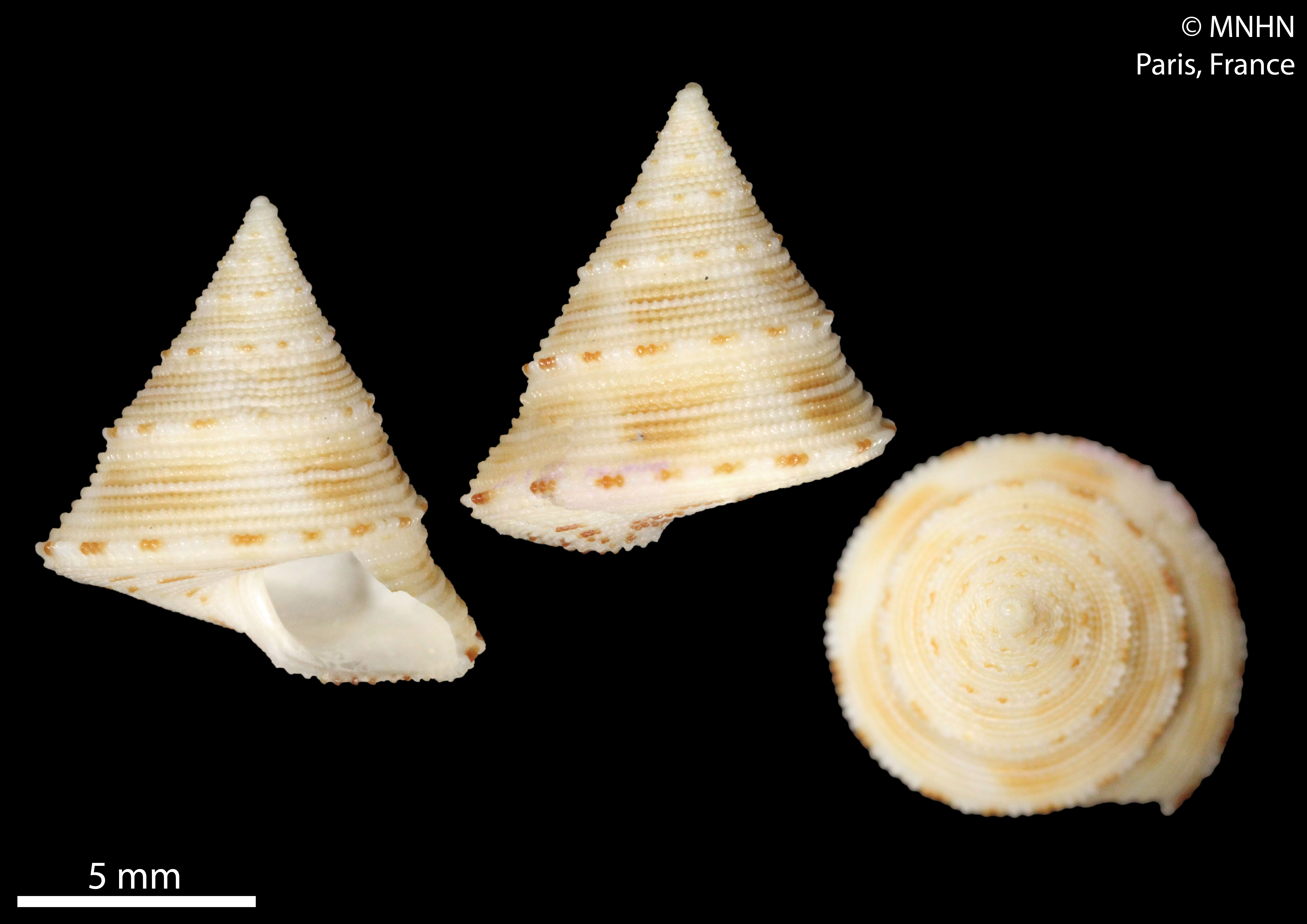
- Shell of Calliostoma xylocinnamomum (specimen at MNHN, Paris)

Scientific classification
- Kingdom: Animalia
- Phylum: Mollusca
- Class: Gastropoda
- Subclass: Vetigastropoda
- Order: Trochida
- Family: Calliostomatidae
- Genus: Calliostoma
- Species: C. xylocinnamomum

Binomial name
- Calliostoma xylocinnamomum Vilvens, 2005

= Calliostoma xylocinnamomum =

Species of gastropod

Calliostoma xylocinnamomum is a species of sea snail, a marine gastropod mollusk in the family Calliostomatidae.

Some authors place this taxon in the subgenus Calliostoma (Ampullotrochus).

== Etymology ==
Comes from greek for cinnamon wood, with reference to the light brown colour of the shell

== Description ==
Calliostoma xylocinnamomum is coeloconoidal with a moderately elevated spire, and an angular periphery. It has granular spiral cords which alternate white and brown segments. The height of the shell can reach 11.5 mm (0.45 in) and 10.8 mm (0.43 in) in width.

== Distribution ==
This marine species occurs in the Pacific Ocean off the Fiji Islands and Wallis and Futuna.
