= Calliostoma hendersoni =

Scientific classification
- Kingdom: Animalia
- Phylum: Mollusca
- Class: Gastropoda
- Subclass: Vetigastropoda
- Order: Trochida
- Family: Calliostomatidae
- Genus: Calliostoma
- Species: C. hendersoni

Binomial name
- Calliostoma hendersoni Dall, 1927

Species of gastropod

Calliostoma hendersoni is a species of sea snail, a marine gastropod mollusk in the family Calliostomatidae.

== Description ==
The height of the shell attains 28 mm. The shell has a base with reddish-brown lines against a cream-colored shell.

== Distribution ==
This marine species occurs in the Gulf of Mexico and in the Atlantic Ocean off the Bahamas.
