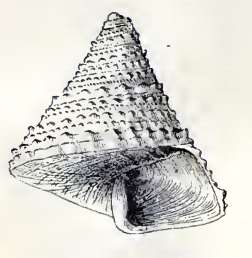
- Original drawing of a shell of Calliostoma orion

Scientific classification
- Kingdom: Animalia
- Phylum: Mollusca
- Class: Gastropoda
- Subclass: Vetigastropoda
- Order: Trochida
- Family: Calliostomatidae
- Genus: Calliostoma
- Species: C. orion

Binomial name
- Calliostoma orion Dall, 1889

Synonyms
- Calliostoma (Calliostoma) orion Dall, 1889

= Calliostoma orion =

Species of gastropod

Calliostoma orion is a species of sea snail, a marine gastropod mollusk in the family Calliostomatidae.

== Description ==
(Original description by W.H. Dall) The size of the shell varies between 8 mm and 20 mm. The small, white shell has an acutely conical shape with a glassy sinistral globular nucleus and five (or more) whorls. The radiating sculpture consists of faint incremental lines. The spiral sculpture on the upper surface of the body whorl consists of seven nodulous revolving lines, beginning at the suture; the first, third, and fifth have larger nodules elongated in the direction of the lines, the second and fourth are more finely and simply evenly beaded. A single fine raised not nodulous thread separates each pair of the preceding. The sixth and seventh spirals are smaller than the fifth and close together. They stretch over a series of more distant swellings, and are concavely impressed between them. As these lines form the periphery, this gives a wavy or scalloped outline to the base, which has about eighteen such waves arranged to a certain extent in pairs, the distance and concavity between them alternating greater and less. The longer waves are articulated with pale brown, and the first and third spirals show traces of a similar articulation. The base of the shell is pretty sharply carinated, flattened, and finely spirally threaded. Some of the threads show faint traces of articulation The columella is nearly straight. The aperture is nearly rectangular. There is no umbilicus or pit.

== Distribution ==
This species occurs in the Gulf of Mexico and in the Caribbean Sea; in the Atlantic Ocean off the Bahamas at depths between 20 m and 146 m.
