= Calliostoma iwaotakii =

Scientific classification
- Kingdom: Animalia
- Phylum: Mollusca
- Class: Gastropoda
- Subclass: Vetigastropoda
- Order: Trochida
- Family: Calliostomatidae
- Genus: Calliostoma
- Species: C. iwaotakii

Binomial name
- Calliostoma iwaotakii (Azuma, 1961)

Synonyms
- Tristichotrochus iwaotakii Azuma, 1961

Species of gastropod

Calliostoma iwaotakii is a species of sea snail, a marine gastropod mollusk in the family Calliostomatidae.

Some authors place this taxon in the subgenus Calliostoma (Tristichotrochus)
