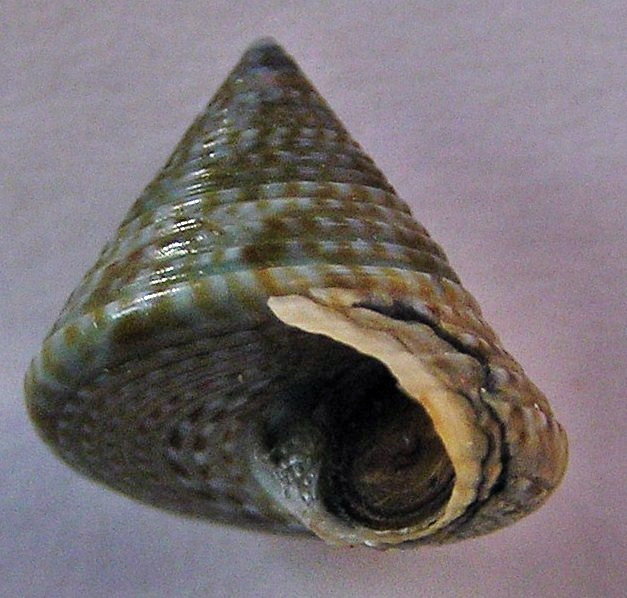
- Apertural view of a shell of Calliostoma virescens

Scientific classification
- Kingdom: Animalia
- Phylum: Mollusca
- Class: Gastropoda
- Subclass: Vetigastropoda
- Order: Trochida
- Family: Calliostomatidae
- Genus: Calliostoma
- Species: C. virescens

Binomial name
- Calliostoma virescens Coen, 1933

= Calliostoma virescens =

Calliostoma virescens..

Species of gastropod

Calliostoma virescens is a species of sea snail, a marine gastropod mollusk in the family Calliostomatidae.

== Description ==
The height of the shell varies between 10 mm and 15 mm.

== Distribution ==
This species occurs in the Adriatic Sea.
