= Calliostoma gubbiolii =

Scientific classification
- Kingdom: Animalia
- Phylum: Mollusca
- Class: Gastropoda
- Subclass: Vetigastropoda
- Order: Trochida
- Family: Calliostomatidae
- Genus: Calliostoma
- Species: C. gubbiolii

Binomial name
- Calliostoma gubbiolii Nofroni, 1984

Synonyms
- Calliostoma (Ampullotrochus) gubbiolii Nofroni, 1984

Species of gastropod

Calliostoma gubbiolii is a species of sea snail, a marine gastropod mollusk in the family Calliostomatidae.

== Description ==
The length of the shell varies between 15 mm and 24 mm.

== Distribution ==
This marine species occurs in Western European waters; in the Atlantic Ocean off the Canary Islands and from Senegal to Angola.
