= Calliostoma angolense =

Scientific classification
- Kingdom: Animalia
- Phylum: Mollusca
- Class: Gastropoda
- Subclass: Vetigastropoda
- Order: Trochida
- Family: Calliostomatidae
- Genus: Calliostoma
- Species: C. angolense

Binomial name
- Calliostoma angolense Boyer, 2006

Synonyms
- Calliostoma fernandesi Boyer, 2006

Species of gastropod

Calliostoma angolense is a species of sea snail, a marine gastropod mollusk in the family Calliostomatidae.

== Distribution ==
This species occurs in the Atlantic Ocean off Angola.
