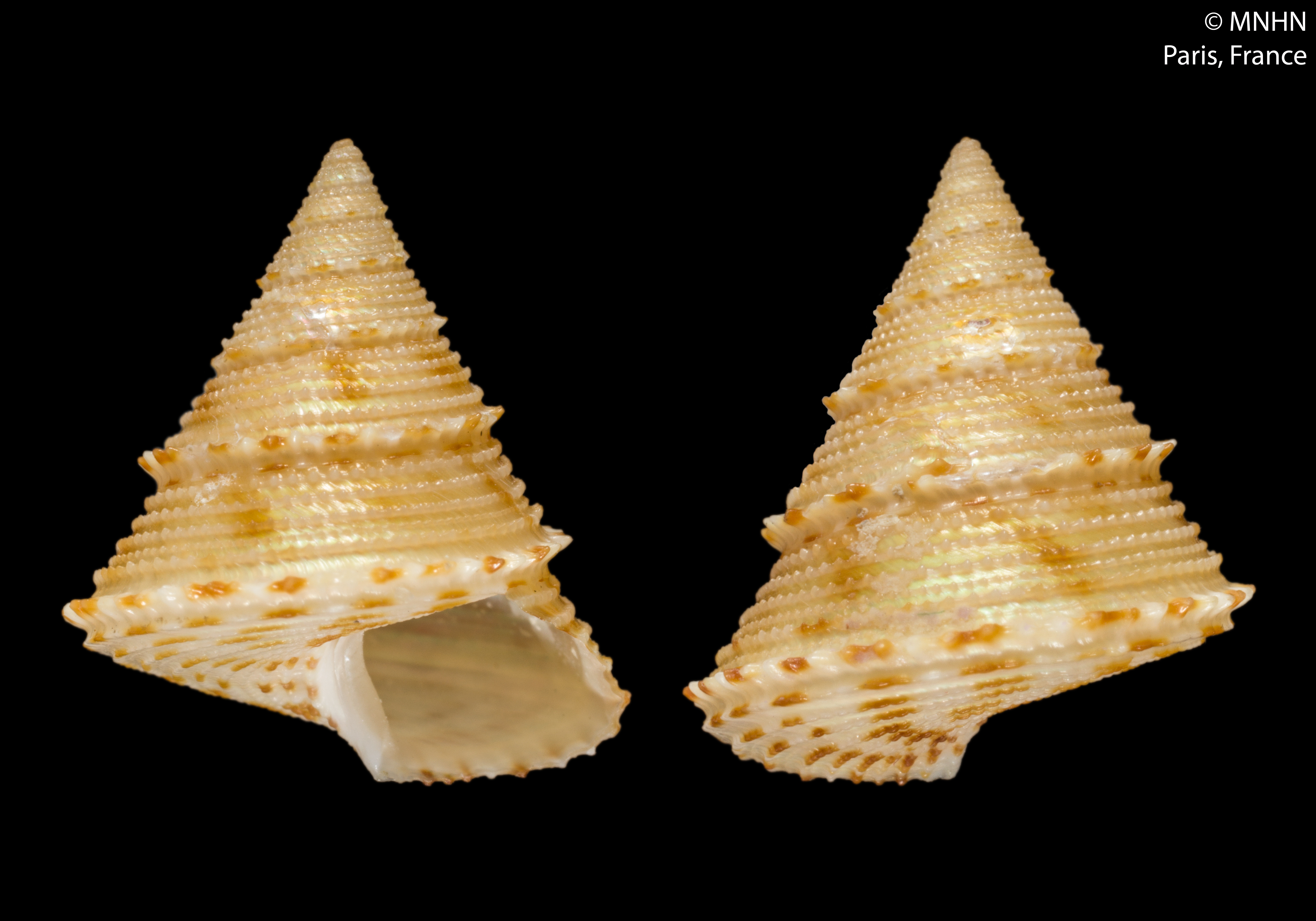
- Shell of Calliostoma suduirauti (holotype at MNHN, Paris)

Scientific classification
- Kingdom: Animalia
- Phylum: Mollusca
- Class: Gastropoda
- Subclass: Vetigastropoda
- Order: Trochida
- Family: Calliostomatidae
- Genus: Calliostoma
- Species: C. suduirauti

Binomial name
- Calliostoma suduirauti Bozzetti, 1997

Synonyms
- Calliostoma (Ampullotrochus) suduirauti Bozzetti, 1997

= Calliostoma suduirauti =

Species of sea snail

Calliostoma suduirauti is a species of sea snail, a marine gastropod mollusk in the family Calliostomatidae.

This taxon was originally placed in the subgenus Calliostoma (Ampullotrochus).

== Description ==
The size of the shell varies between 11 mm and 15 mm.

== Distribution ==
This marine species occurs off the Philippines.
