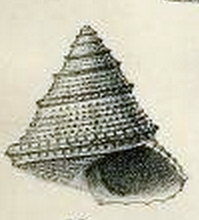
- Original drawing of a shell of Calliostoma thrincoma

Scientific classification
- Kingdom: Animalia
- Phylum: Mollusca
- Class: Gastropoda
- Subclass: Vetigastropoda
- Order: Trochida
- Family: Calliostomatidae
- Genus: Calliostoma
- Species: C. thrincoma

Binomial name
- Calliostoma thrincoma Melvill & Standen, 1903

Synonyms
- Calliostoma (Calliostoma) thrincoma Melvill, J.C. & R. Standen, 1903

= Calliostoma thrincoma =

Species of gastropod

Calliostoma thrincoma is a species of sea snail, a marine gastropod mollusk in the family Calliostomatidae.

== Description ==
The height of this conical-pyramidal, imperforate shell attains 11 mm. It is highly sculptured and conspicuously keeled around every whorl just above the suture. The body whorl at the periphery is bicarinate. The aperture is square-shaped.

== Distribution ==
This species occurs in the Gulf of Oman.
