= Calliostoma takujii =

Scientific classification
- Kingdom: Animalia
- Phylum: Mollusca
- Class: Gastropoda
- Subclass: Vetigastropoda
- Order: Trochida
- Family: Calliostomatidae
- Genus: Calliostoma
- Species: C. takujii

Binomial name
- Calliostoma takujii Kosuge, 1986

Synonyms
- Calliostoma (Calliostoma) takujii Kosuge, 1986

Species of gastropod

Calliostoma takujii is a species of sea snail, a marine gastropod mollusk in the family Calliostomatidae.

Some authors place this taxon in the subgenus Calliostoma (Fautor).

== Description ==
The height of the shell attains 12 mm.

== Distribution ==
This marine species occurs off Japan and the Philippines.
