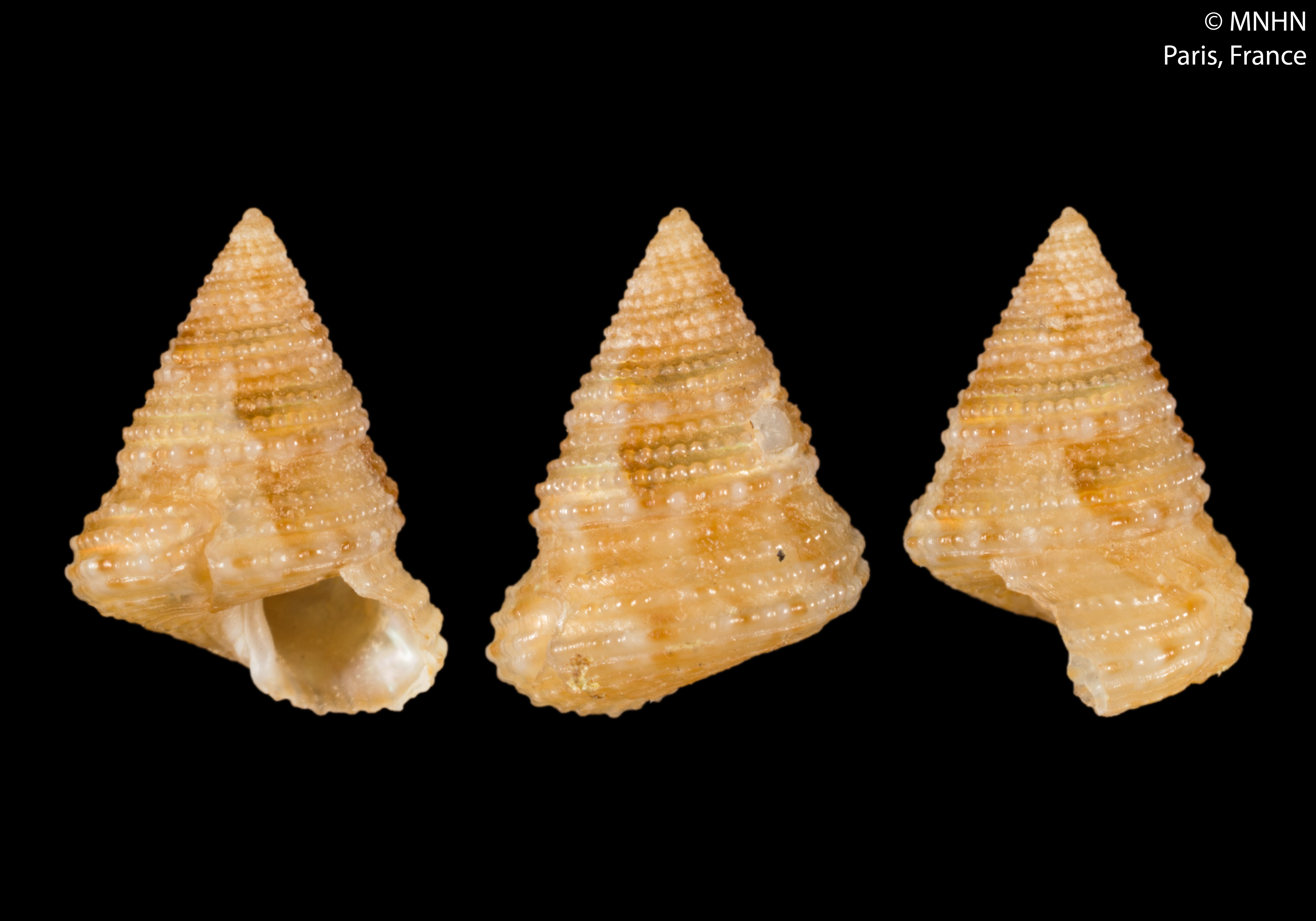
- Shell of Calliostoma fernandesi (holotype at MNHN, Paris)

Scientific classification
- Kingdom: Animalia
- Phylum: Mollusca
- Class: Gastropoda
- Subclass: Vetigastropoda
- Order: Trochida
- Family: Calliostomatidae
- Genus: Calliostoma
- Species: C. fernandesi

Binomial name
- Calliostoma fernandesi Rolan & Monteiro, 2006

= Calliostoma fernandesi =

Species of gastropod

Calliostoma fernandesi, is a species of sea snail, a marine gastropod mollusk in the family Calliostomatidae.

== Distribution ==
This species occurs in the Atlantic Ocean off the Cape Verde Archipelago.
