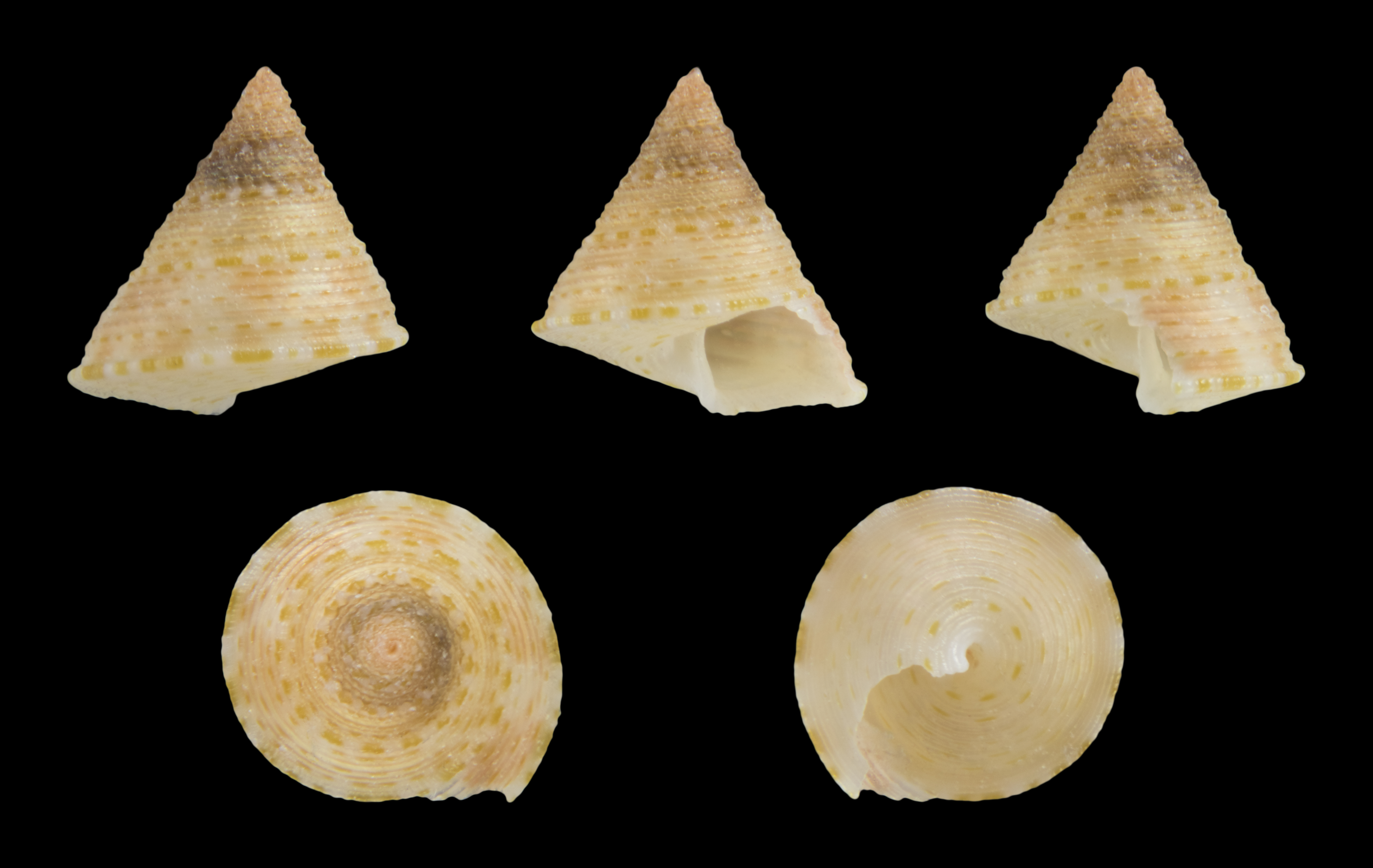

Scientific classification
- Kingdom: Animalia
- Phylum: Mollusca
- Class: Gastropoda
- Subclass: Vetigastropoda
- Order: Trochida
- Family: Calliostomatidae
- Genus: Calliostoma
- Species: C. ticaonicum

Binomial name
- Calliostoma ticaonicum (A. Adams, 1851)

Synonyms
- Calliostoma (Calliostoma) ticaonicum (A. Adams, 1851); Ziziphinus ticaonicus A. Adams, 1851 (basionym)

= Calliostoma ticaonicum =

Species of gastropod

Calliostoma ticaonicum is a species of sea snail, a marine gastropod mollusk in the family Calliostomatidae.

== Description ==
The sharply conical shell is elevated but still rather small : 5 – 20 mm. It is perforate. Its color goes from a yellowish-brown to a pale pink. It is ornamented at the suture with lirae articulated with rufous. The apex is blackish-purple. The whorls are slightly angled, a little rounded, and longitudinally striate. They are sculptured with fine spiral cords. The body whorl is subangular. The base of the shell is almost flat with the umbilicus absent. The base is sculptured with rufous-articulated cinguli. The aperture is subquadrate. The columella is straight, and subtruncated anteriorly. The aperture is white inside.

== Distribution ==
This species can be found in the seas off the Philippines and Japan.
