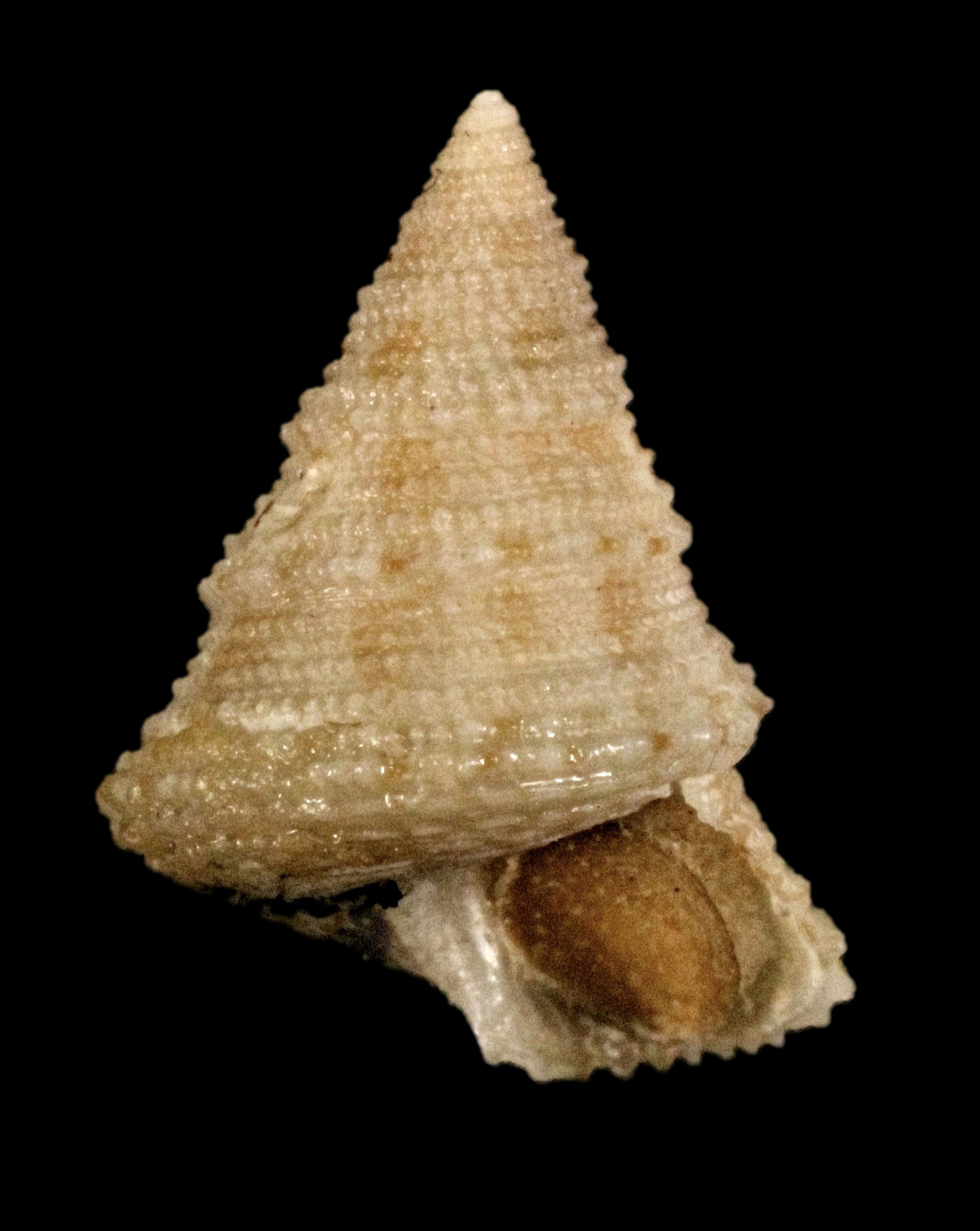

Scientific classification
- Kingdom: Animalia
- Phylum: Mollusca
- Class: Gastropoda
- Subclass: Vetigastropoda
- Order: Trochida
- Family: Calliostomatidae
- Genus: Calliostoma
- Species: C. fascinans

Binomial name
- Calliostoma fascinans Schwengel & McGinty, 1942

= Calliostoma fascinans =

Species of gastropod

Calliostoma fascinans is a species of sea snail, a marine gastropod mollusk in the family Calliostomatidae.

== Description ==
The height of the shell attains 12 mm.

== Distribution ==
This species occurs in the Gulf of Mexico at depths between 68 m and 126 m.
