= Calliostoma cubense =

Scientific classification
- Kingdom: Animalia
- Phylum: Mollusca
- Class: Gastropoda
- Subclass: Vetigastropoda
- Order: Trochida
- Family: Calliostomatidae
- Genus: Calliostoma
- Species: C. cubense

Binomial name
- Calliostoma cubense Quinn, 1992

Species of gastropod

Calliostoma cubense is a species of sea snail, a marine gastropod mollusk in the family Calliostomatidae.

== Distribution ==
This species occurs in the Gulf of Mexico and in the Caribbean Sea off Cuba.

== Description ==
The maximum recorded shell length is 16.6 mm.

== Habitat ==
Minimum recorded depth is 11 m. Maximum recorded depth is 11 m.
