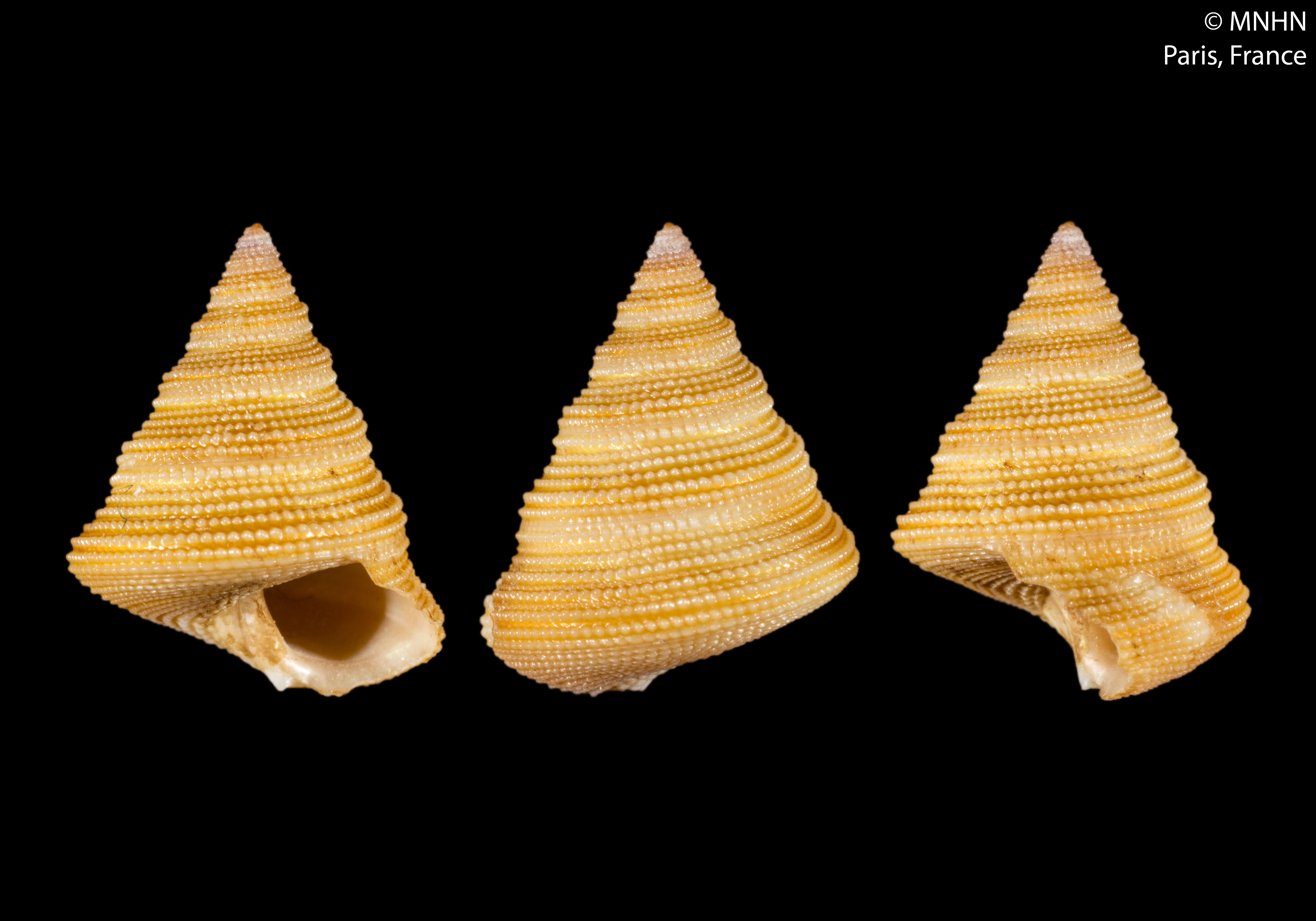
- Shell of Calliostoma aprosceptum (holotype at MNHN, Paris)

Scientific classification
- Kingdom: Animalia
- Phylum: Mollusca
- Class: Gastropoda
- Subclass: Vetigastropoda
- Order: Trochida
- Family: Calliostomatidae
- Genus: Calliostoma
- Species: C. aprosceptum

Binomial name
- Calliostoma aprosceptum Vilvens, 2009

Synonyms
- Calliostoma (Fautor) aprosceptum Vilvens, 2009

= Calliostoma aprosceptum =

Species of gastropod

Calliostoma aprosceptum is a species of sea snail, a marine gastropod mollusk in the family Calliostomatidae.

== Description ==
The height of the shell attains 12 mm. Beige to brown in color with a spiral-like shell.

== Distribution ==
This marine species occurs off New Caledonia.
