= Calliostoma vicdani =

Scientific classification
- Kingdom: Animalia
- Phylum: Mollusca
- Class: Gastropoda
- Subclass: Vetigastropoda
- Order: Trochida
- Family: Calliostomatidae
- Genus: Calliostoma
- Species: C. vicdani

Binomial name
- Calliostoma vicdani Kosuge, 1984

Synonyms
- Calliostoma (Fautor) jackelynae Bozzetti, L., 1997; Calliostoma (Kombologian) vicdani Kosuge, 1984

Species of gastropod

Calliostoma vicdani is a species of sea snail, a marine gastropod mollusk in the family Calliostomatidae.

Some authors place this taxon in the subgenus Calliostoma (Kombologion).

== Description ==
The length of the shell varies between 20 mm and 33 mm. The shell features six to eight main spiral cords they are covered in strong, regularly spaced beads. The overall color of the shell is reddish or purplish, usually marked with reddish-brown speckles or cloud-like patches.

== Distribution ==
This marine species occurs off the Philippines.
