= Calliostoma strobilos =

Scientific classification
- Kingdom: Animalia
- Phylum: Mollusca
- Class: Gastropoda
- Subclass: Vetigastropoda
- Order: Trochida
- Family: Calliostomatidae
- Genus: Calliostoma
- Species: C. strobilos

Binomial name
- Calliostoma strobilos Vilvens, 2005

Synonyms
- Calliostoma (Fautor) strobilos Vilvens, 2005

Species of gastropod

Calliostoma strobilos is a species of sea snail, a marine gastropod mollusk in the family Calliostomatidae.

Some authors place this taxon in the subgenus Calliostoma (Fautor).

== Description ==
The height of the shell attains 14 mm.

== Distribution ==
This species occurs in the Pacific Ocean off the Fiji Islands.
