= Calliostoma scalenum =

Scientific classification
- Kingdom: Animalia
- Phylum: Mollusca
- Class: Gastropoda
- Subclass: Vetigastropoda
- Order: Trochida
- Family: Calliostomatidae
- Genus: Calliostoma
- Species: C. scalenum

Binomial name
- Calliostoma scalenum Quinn, 1992

Synonyms
- Calliostoma jujubinum auct. non Gmelin, 1791

Species of gastropod

Calliostoma scalenum, common name the Gulfstream top shell, is a species of sea snail, a marine gastropod mollusk in the family Calliostomatidae.

== Description ==
The size of the shell varies between 14 mm and 41 mm.

== Distribution ==
This species occurs in the Gulf of Mexico and in the Atlantic Ocean off North Carolina, USA, at depths between 25 m and 80 m.
