= Calliostoma marionae =

Scientific classification
- Kingdom: Animalia
- Phylum: Mollusca
- Class: Gastropoda
- Subclass: Vetigastropoda
- Order: Trochida
- Family: Calliostomatidae
- Genus: Calliostoma
- Species: C. marionae

Binomial name
- Calliostoma marionae Dall, 1906

Synonyms
- Calliostoma faustum Schwengel & McGinty, 1942; Calliostoma (Leiotrochus) marionae Dall, 1906 (original description)

Species of gastropod

Calliostoma marionae, common name Marion's top shell, is a species of sea snail, a marine gastropod mollusk in the family Calliostomatidae.

== Description ==
(Original description by W.H. Dall) The height of the shell attains 30 mm. The shell has an acutely conic, with the sides of the spire slightly concave. It contains 10 brilliantly polished whorls. The color of the shell is a rich brick-red. It is mottled near the periphery with whitish flammules. The white nucleus is translucent and tilted obliquely. The sculpture on the subsequent four or five whorls, of five (5) granular, spiral ridges, separated only by narrow incised lines, with a more conspicuous ridge just above the suture. Subsequently, the ridges become flattened, wider and more or less spirally striate on their tops, while the original five incised lines retain a darker color than the rest of the surface. The suture is not strongly marked and runs just below the periphery of the preceding whorl. The base of the shell (diameter: 16 mm) is slightly convex, with ten or eleven similar incised spiral lines stronger toward the umbilicus, where the interspaces become feebly nodulous. The last one on the brink of the umbilicus is more strongly so. The umbilicus is moderately large (diameter 2.5 mm) and funicular. Its walls are white, smooth, and slightly excavated just within the basal margin. The white columella is thin, arcuate, ending in a blunt projection separated by a small notch from the basal margin of the aperture, which, with the outer lip, is thin and sharp. The throat is pearly, without lirations or callus on the body.

The periphery is subangulate, becoming rounded in the adult. The operculum is thin, horny, multi-spiral, with about 14 whorls.

The animal is of a reddish color somewhat like the shell. The sides of the foot are granular. The muzzle is concentrically wrinkled. The tentacles are long and slender, with no pericephalic veil between them. The eyes are large and black, on short but distinct peduncles, behind and above the tentacles. The epipodial lobes contain papillose edges and two or three more elongate processes on each side, but none project from the opercular lobe. The foot is short and rather blunt behind. As contracted from immersion in alcohol, the tentacles and epipodial processes seem smooth, and show no such ciliation as is figured by Adams in Calliostoma, while the absence of the "veil" is noteworthy.

== Distribution ==
This species occurs in the Gulf of Mexico at depths between 21 m and 165 m; in the Atlantic Ocean off North Carolina, South Carolina and Florida, USA.
