= Calliostoma admirandum =

Scientific classification
- Kingdom: Animalia
- Phylum: Mollusca
- Class: Gastropoda
- Subclass: Vetigastropoda
- Order: Trochida
- Family: Calliostomatidae
- Genus: Calliostoma
- Species: C. admirandum

Binomial name
- Calliostoma admirandum E.A. Smith, 1906

Synonyms
- Calliostoma (Fautor) admirandum Smith, E.A., 1906

Species of gastropod

Calliostoma admirandum is a species of sea snail, a marine gastropod mollusk in the family Calliostomatidae.

== Distribution ==
This species occurs in the Eastern Indian Ocean off India.
