= Calliostoma sublaeve =

Scientific classification
- Kingdom: Animalia
- Phylum: Mollusca
- Class: Gastropoda
- Subclass: Vetigastropoda
- Order: Trochida
- Family: Calliostomatidae
- Genus: Calliostoma
- Species: C. sublaeve

Binomial name
- Calliostoma sublaeve E.A. Smith, 1895

Synonyms
- Calliostoma sublaevis Smith, 1895

Species of gastropod

Calliostoma sublaeve is a species of sea snail, a marine gastropod mollusk in the family Calliostomatidae.

== Description ==
The size of the shell varies between 25 mm and 40 mm.

== Distribution ==
This marine species occurs off India, Sri Lanka and the Andaman Islands at depths between 80 m and 640 m.
