= Calliostoma otukai =

Scientific classification
- Kingdom: Animalia
- Phylum: Mollusca
- Class: Gastropoda
- Subclass: Vetigastropoda
- Order: Trochida
- Family: Calliostomatidae
- Genus: Calliostoma
- Species: C. otukai

Binomial name
- Calliostoma otukai (Ikebe, 1942)

Synonyms
- Calliostoma (Otukaia) ikukoae Sakurai, 1994; Otukaia otukai Ikebe, 1942 (original combination)

Species of gastropod

Calliostoma otukai is a species of sea snail, a marine gastropod mollusk in the family Calliostomatidae.

Some authors place this taxon in the subgenus Calliostoma (Otukaia).
