= Calliostoma imperiale =

Scientific classification
- Kingdom: Animalia
- Phylum: Mollusca
- Class: Gastropoda
- Subclass: Vetigastropoda
- Order: Trochida
- Family: Calliostomatidae
- Genus: Calliostoma
- Species: C. imperiale

Binomial name
- Calliostoma imperiale Kosuge, 1979

Synonyms
- Calliostoma imperialis Kosuge, 1979

Species of gastropod

Calliostoma imperiale is a species of sea snail, a marine gastropod mollusk in the family Calliostomatidae.

== Distribution ==
This species occurs in the Pacific Ocean off the Midway Islands.
