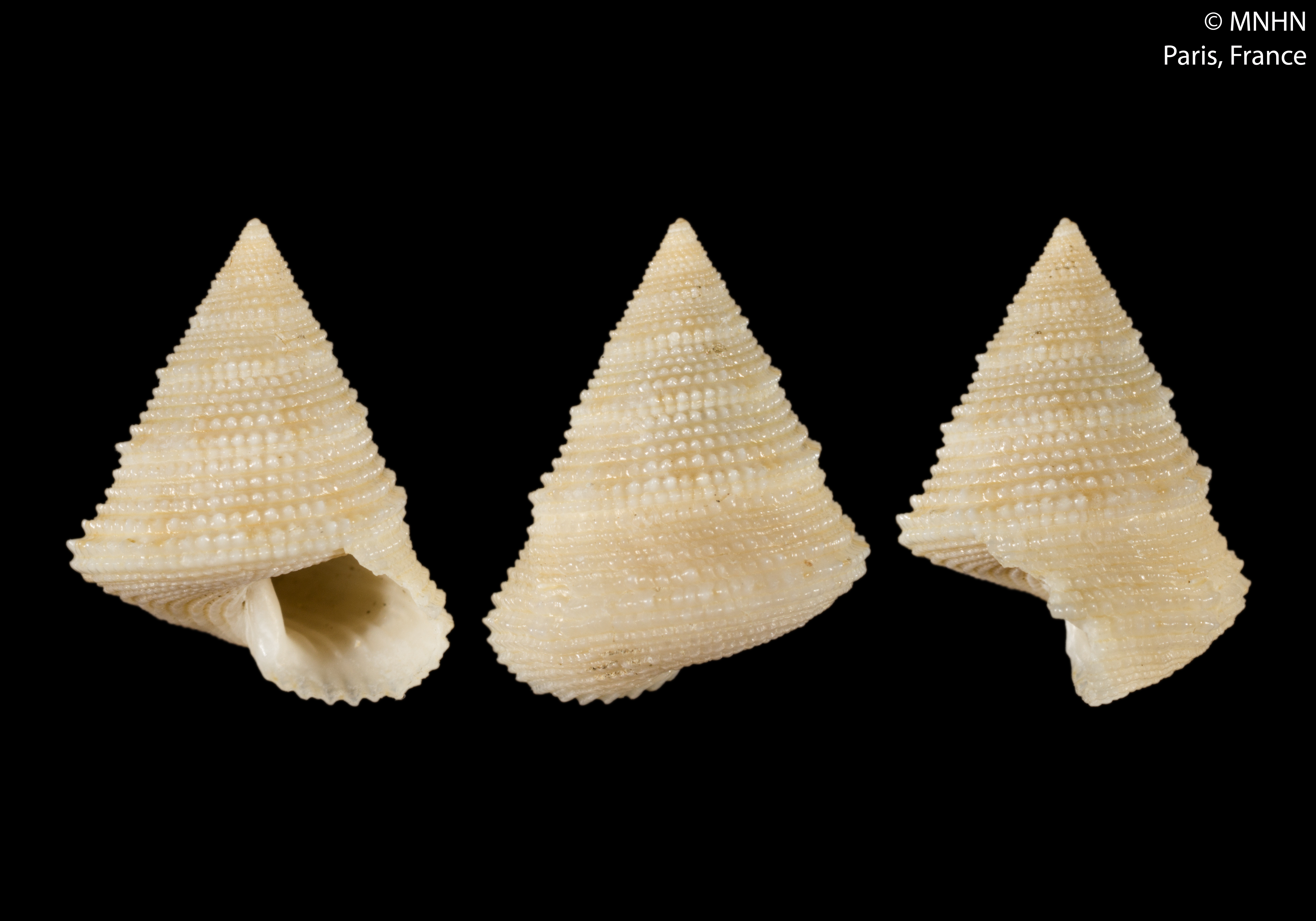
- Shell of Calliostoma aporia (holotype at MNHN, Paris)

Scientific classification
- Kingdom: Animalia
- Phylum: Mollusca
- Class: Gastropoda
- Subclass: Vetigastropoda
- Order: Trochida
- Family: Calliostomatidae
- Genus: Calliostoma
- Species: C. aporia

Binomial name
- Calliostoma aporia Vilvens, 2009

= Calliostoma aporia =

Species of gastropod

Calliostoma aporia is a species of sea snail, a marine gastropod mollusk in the family Calliostomatidae.

== Distribution ==
This marine species occurs off the Solomon Islands.
