= Calliostoma filiareginae =

Scientific classification
- Kingdom: Animalia
- Phylum: Mollusca
- Class: Gastropoda
- Subclass: Vetigastropoda
- Order: Trochida
- Family: Calliostomatidae
- Genus: Calliostoma
- Species: C. filiareginae

Binomial name
- Calliostoma filiareginae (Sakurai, 1994)

Synonyms
- Kombologion filiareginae Sakurai, 1994

Species of gastropod

Calliostoma filiareginae is a species of sea snail, a marine gastropod mollusk in the family Calliostomatidae.

Some authors place this taxon in the subgenus Calliostoma (Kombologion).

== Description ==
The size of the shell varies between 9 mm and 13 mm.

== Distribution ==
This marine species occurs off Japan.
