= Calliostoma semisuave =

Scientific classification
- Kingdom: Animalia
- Phylum: Mollusca
- Class: Gastropoda
- Subclass: Vetigastropoda
- Order: Trochida
- Family: Calliostomatidae
- Genus: Calliostoma
- Species: C. semisuave

Binomial name
- Calliostoma semisuave Quinn, 1992

Species of sea snail

Calliostoma semisuave is a species of deep-water sea snail, a marine gastropod mollusk in the family Calliostomatidae. It is native to the Western Atlantic Ocean.

== Description ==
The size of the shell varies between 10 mm and 15 mm. The shell is trochiform (shaped like a top) and conical. As indicated by the specific epithet semisuave, the sculpture of the shell is smoother than many other members of the genus Calliostoma, which are often heavily beaded. The shell possesses spiral cords that may be beaded in the subsutural zone (below the seam of the whorls) but often become smoother toward the periphery. The aperture is sub-quadrate with a nacreous (pearly) interior.

== Distribution ==
This species occurs in the Western Atlantic Ocean, specifically within the Gulf of Mexico and the Straits of Florida. It is a deep-water (bathyal) species, typically found at depths ranging from 200 to 600 m (660 to 1,970 ft).
