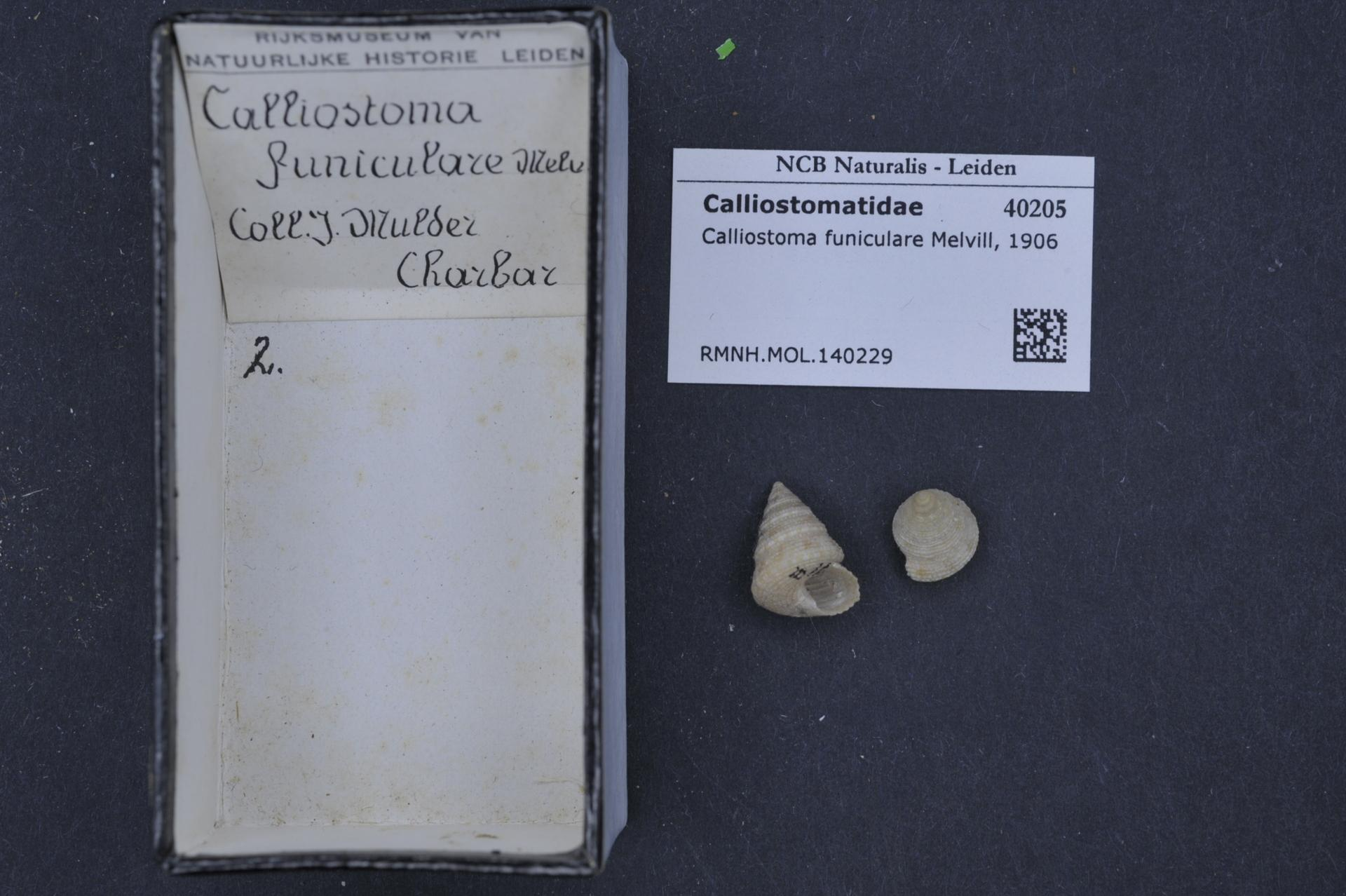

Scientific classification
- Kingdom: Animalia
- Phylum: Mollusca
- Class: Gastropoda
- Subclass: Vetigastropoda
- Order: Trochida
- Family: Calliostomatidae
- Genus: Calliostoma
- Species: C. funiculare

Binomial name
- Calliostoma funiculare Melvill, 1906

Synonyms
- Calliostoma (Fautor) funiculare Melvill, 1906

= Calliostoma funiculare =

Species of gastropod

Calliostoma funiculare is a species of sea snail, a marine gastropod mollusk in the family Calliostomatidae.

Some authors place this taxon in the subgenus Calliostoma (Fautor)

== Distribution ==
This species occurs in the Persian Gulf.
