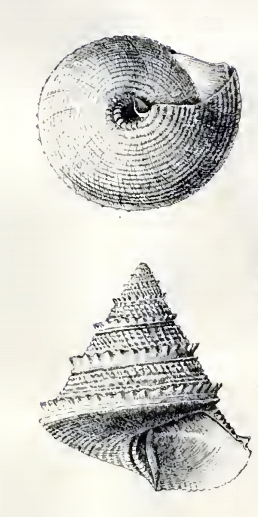
- Original drawing with two views of a shell of Calliostoma cinctellum

Scientific classification
- Kingdom: Animalia
- Phylum: Mollusca
- Class: Gastropoda
- Subclass: Vetigastropoda
- Order: Trochida
- Family: Calliostomatidae
- Genus: Calliostoma
- Species: C. cinctellum

Binomial name
- Calliostoma cinctellum Dall, 1889

Synonyms
- Basilissa cinctellum (Dall, 1889); Calliostoma (Eutrochus) cinctellum Dall, 1889

= Calliostoma cinctellum =

Species of gastropod

Calliostoma cinctellum is a species of sea snail, a marine gastropod mollusk in the family Calliostomatidae.

== Description ==
The maximum recorded shell length is 9.5 mm.

(Original description by W.H. Dall) The small, thin shell is pearly white with faint touches of pale brown, The spire contains 7 whorls with a globular inverted minute nucleus and a rather convex base.

The spiral sculpture shows two prominent spirals, one peripheral, simple, sharp, with occasional touches of brown. Against this the suture is laid in the earlier whorls, while in the body whorl it descends below it. The other spiral is above the periphery, and is stronger and ornamented with (on the last whorl) about forty sharp projecting thornlike tubercles, each inclined a little forward, and alternating brown and white. Between this and the periphery the space is excavated. Above these there are about four (on the earlier whorls one or two) small raised spiral lines separated by much wider interspaces, nodulated with small but prominent nodules at the intersections with the radiating sculpture. All the sculpture grows fainter, and intercalary fine lines appear toward the aperture on the last whorl. The base of the shell has two strong nodulous spirals separated by a deep interspace, the inner one forming the umbilical margin. Outside of these 16-20 fine flattened spiral threads, with about equal interspaces, reach to the periphery and are hardly ruffled by the incremental lines.

The radiating sculpture consists of numerous, on the early whorls strong, slightly elevated oblique threads, extending clear across the whorls and reticulating the spirals. These radii grow fainter and finally on the body whorl nearly disappear;. On the base there are only faint flexuous incremental lines. The walls of the narrow umbilicus are flexuous and yellow. The aperture is squarish. The little columella is concave, not toothed. The margin is thin and simple. The upper surface of the whorls, except the sculpture, is flattened. The suture is distinct, not channelled. The horny operculum is multispiral.

The soft parts of the gastropod are whitish. The foot is short, pointed behind. The muzzle is rounded. The gill is single. The anus is prolonged into a long free papilla. The eyes are large. The tentacles are long and stout, without frontal lobes. The epipodium has a large anterior lobe, and four cirri all anterior to the operculum and about of equal size. The jaws are separate, squarish, composed of small horny obliquely set rods, whose lozenge-shaped end-sections reticulate the surface under the microscope.

The quite minute radula is peculiar. The rhachidian and (on each side) five laterals have broad simple bases with a pear-shaped outline. The cusps, which might be compared to the stem of the pear bent over, are extremely narrow and long and symmetrically serrate on each side with 4-6 serrations. The major uncinus is stout and has a large four-toothed ovate cusp. There are about twenty more slender uncini with scythe-like cusps serrate on the outer edge. Outside of these are two or three of a flat form, like a section of a palm-leaf fan from handle to margin with four riblets, and the distal edge with three or more indentations. Under pressure these uncini have a tendency to split up lengthwise, beginning at the indentations. They are flat and smooth, thinner toward the distal end, and have no distinct shaft.

== Distribution ==
This species occurs in the Caribbean Sea off Cuba at a depth of about 390 m.

== Habitat ==
Minimum recorded depth is 389 m. Maximum recorded depth is 389 m.
