= Calliostoma doncorni =

Scientific classification
- Kingdom: Animalia
- Phylum: Mollusca
- Class: Gastropoda
- Subclass: Vetigastropoda
- Order: Trochida
- Family: Calliostomatidae
- Genus: Calliostoma
- Species: C. doncorni

Binomial name
- Calliostoma doncorni Kay, 1979

Synonyms
- Calliostoma (Tristichotrochus) doncorni Kay, 1979

Species of gastropod

Calliostoma doncorni is a species of sea snail, a marine gastropod mollusk in the family Calliostomatidae.

Some authors place this taxon in the subgenus Calliostoma (Tristichotrochus).

== Distribution ==
This species occurs in the Pacific Ocean off Hawaii.
