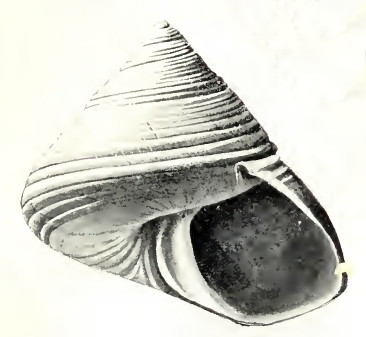
- Original image of a shell of Calliostoma columnarium

Scientific classification
- Kingdom: Animalia
- Phylum: Mollusca
- Class: Gastropoda
- Subclass: Vetigastropoda
- Order: Trochida
- Family: Calliostomatidae
- Genus: Calliostoma
- Species: C. columnarium

Binomial name
- Calliostoma columnarium Hedley & May, 1908

Synonyms
- Calliostoma (Fautor) columnarium Hedley, C. & W.L. May, 1908

= Calliostoma columnarium =

Species of gastropod

Calliostoma columnarium, common name the cape pillar top shell, is a species of sea snail, a marine gastropod mollusk in the family Calliostomatidae.

Some authors place this taxon in the subgenus Calliostoma (Fautor).

== Description ==
(Original description by Hedley & May) The height of the shell attains 8 mm. The rather solid, imperforate shell has a turbinate shape and is angled at the periphery. Its colour is buff. The shell contains 5½ whorls, including a protoconch of a 1½ whorl, which is tilted, malleated, and concluded by a small varix.

Sculpture: three spiral keels appear on the second whorl. As growth proceeds these increase in number but decrease in strength, till at last behind the aperture they are represented by twenty engraved spiral lines extending from the suture to the centre of the base. These are decussated by faint oblique growth lines. The oblique aperture is rhomboidal. The outer lip is simple. The columella thickened. The insertions are joined by a thin callus.

== Distribution ==
This marine species occurs off South Australia and Tasmania.

== Bibliography ==
- Wilson, B. (1993). Australian Marine Shells. Prosobranch Gastropods. Kallaroo, WA : Odyssey Publishing. Vol.1 1st Edn pp. 1–408
