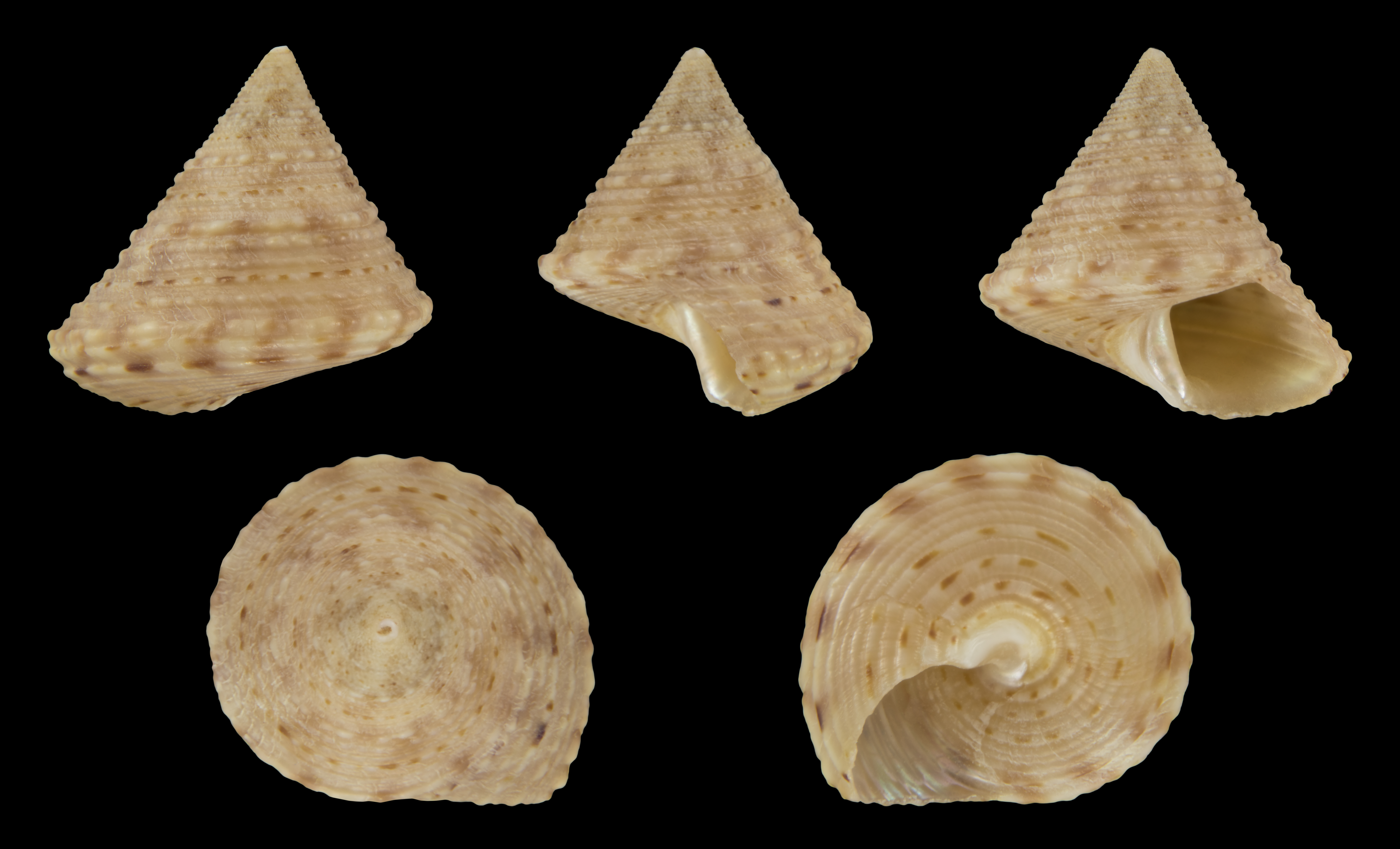

Scientific classification
- Kingdom: Animalia
- Phylum: Mollusca
- Class: Gastropoda
- Subclass: Vetigastropoda
- Order: Trochida
- Family: Calliostomatidae
- Subfamily: Calliostomatinae
- Genus: Calliostoma
- Species: C. hernandezi

Binomial name
- Calliostoma hernandezi Rubio & Gubbioli, 1993

= Calliostoma hernandezi =

Species of gastropod

Calliostoma hernandezi is a species of sea snail, a marine gastropod mollusk in the family Calliostomatidae.

== Description ==
The size of the shell varies between 12 mm and 28 mm.

== Distribution ==
This species occurs in the Atlantic Ocean between Senegal and Angola.
