= Calliostoma thachi =

Scientific classification
- Kingdom: Animalia
- Phylum: Mollusca
- Class: Gastropoda
- Subclass: Vetigastropoda
- Order: Trochida
- Family: Calliostomatidae
- Genus: Calliostoma
- Species: C. thachi

Binomial name
- Calliostoma thachi Alf & Stratmann, 2007

Species of gastropod

Calliostoma thachi is a species of sea snail, a marine gastropod mollusc in the family Calliostomatidae.

Some authors place this taxon in the subgenus Calliostoma (Benthastelena).

== Description ==
The height of the shell attains 21 mm.

== Distribution ==
This marine species occurs off Vietnam.
