= Calliostoma iwamotoi =

Scientific classification
- Kingdom: Animalia
- Phylum: Mollusca
- Class: Gastropoda
- Subclass: Vetigastropoda
- Order: Trochida
- Family: Calliostomatidae
- Genus: Calliostoma
- Species: C. iwamotoi

Binomial name
- Calliostoma iwamotoi Ikebe, 1942

Synonyms
- Calliostoma (Calliostoma) iwamotoi Ikebe, 1942

Species of gastropod

Calliostoma iwamotoi is a species of sea snail, a marine gastropod mollusk in the family Calliostomatidae.

Some authors place this taxon in the subgenus Calliostoma (Tristichotrochus) .

== Description ==
The height of the shell reaches up to 26 mm.

== Distribution ==
Specimens have only been recorded along the southern waters of Japan, such as the mouth of Tokyo Bay. However the species is thought to inhabit the whole coastline of Japan, in benthic zones 100-200 m below sea level.
