= Calliostoma simodense =

Scientific classification
- Kingdom: Animalia
- Phylum: Mollusca
- Class: Gastropoda
- Subclass: Vetigastropoda
- Order: Trochida
- Family: Calliostomatidae
- Genus: Calliostoma
- Species: C. simodense

Binomial name
- Calliostoma simodense Ikebe, 1942

Synonyms
- Calliostoma (Calliostoma) simodense Ikebe, 1942

Species of gastropod

Calliostoma simodense is a species of sea snail, a marine gastropod mollusk in the family Calliostomatidae.

Some authors place this taxon in the subgenus Calliostoma (Tristichotrochus).

== Description ==
The height of the shell attains 10 mm.

== Distribution ==
This marine species occurs in the Indo-Pacific and off Japan.
