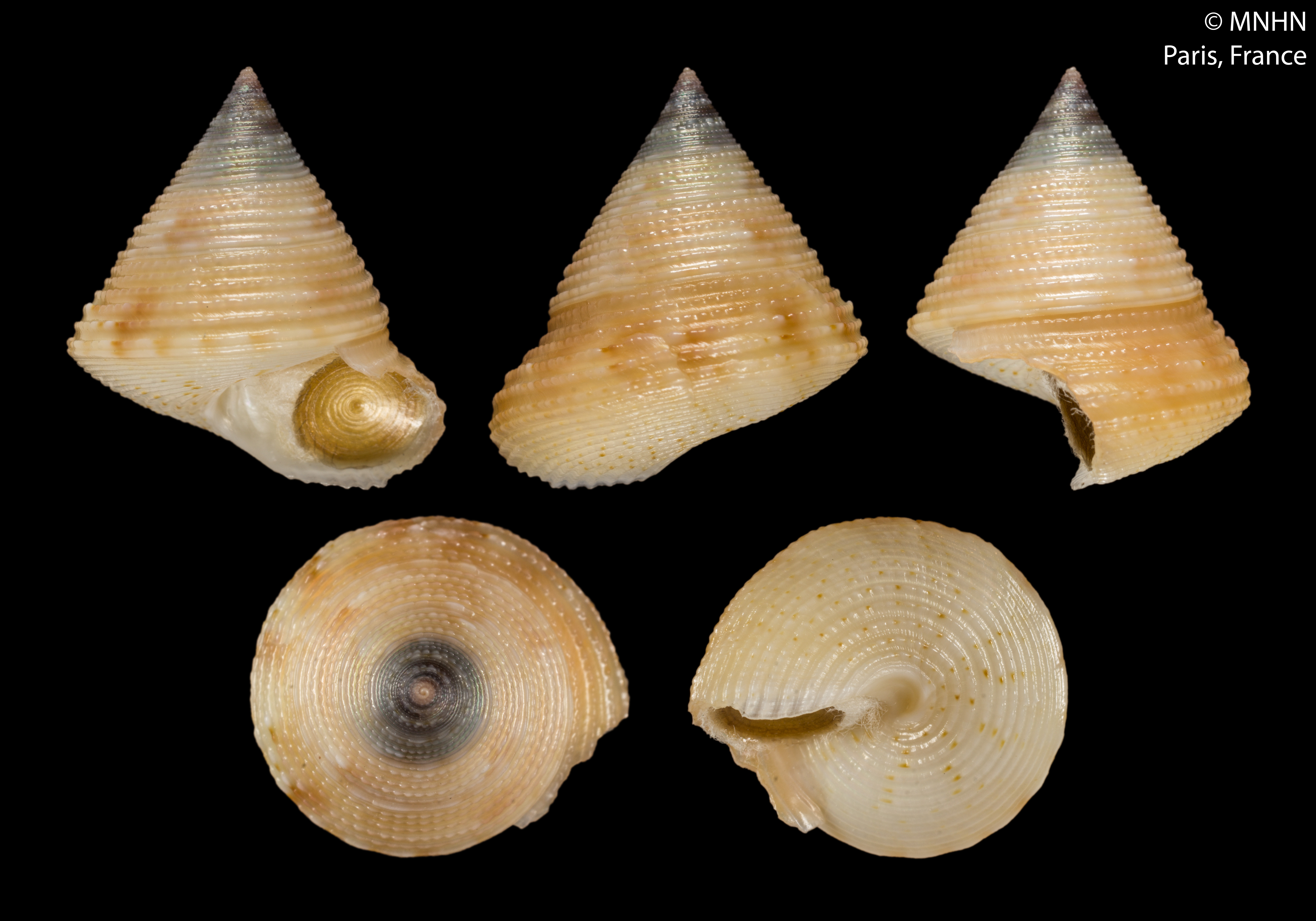
- Calliostoma jackelynae

Scientific classification
- Kingdom: Animalia
- Phylum: Mollusca
- Class: Gastropoda
- Subclass: Vetigastropoda
- Order: Trochida
- Family: Calliostomatidae
- Genus: Calliostoma
- Species: C. jackelynae

Binomial name
- Calliostoma jackelynae Bozzetti, 1997

Synonyms
- Calliostoma (Fautor) jackelynae Bozzetti, 1997

= Calliostoma jackelynae =

Species of gastropod

Calliostoma jackelynae is a species of sea snail, a marine gastropod mollusk in the family Calliostomatidae.

Some authors place this taxon in the subgenus Calliostoma (Fautor).

== Distribution ==
This marine species occurs off the Philippines.
