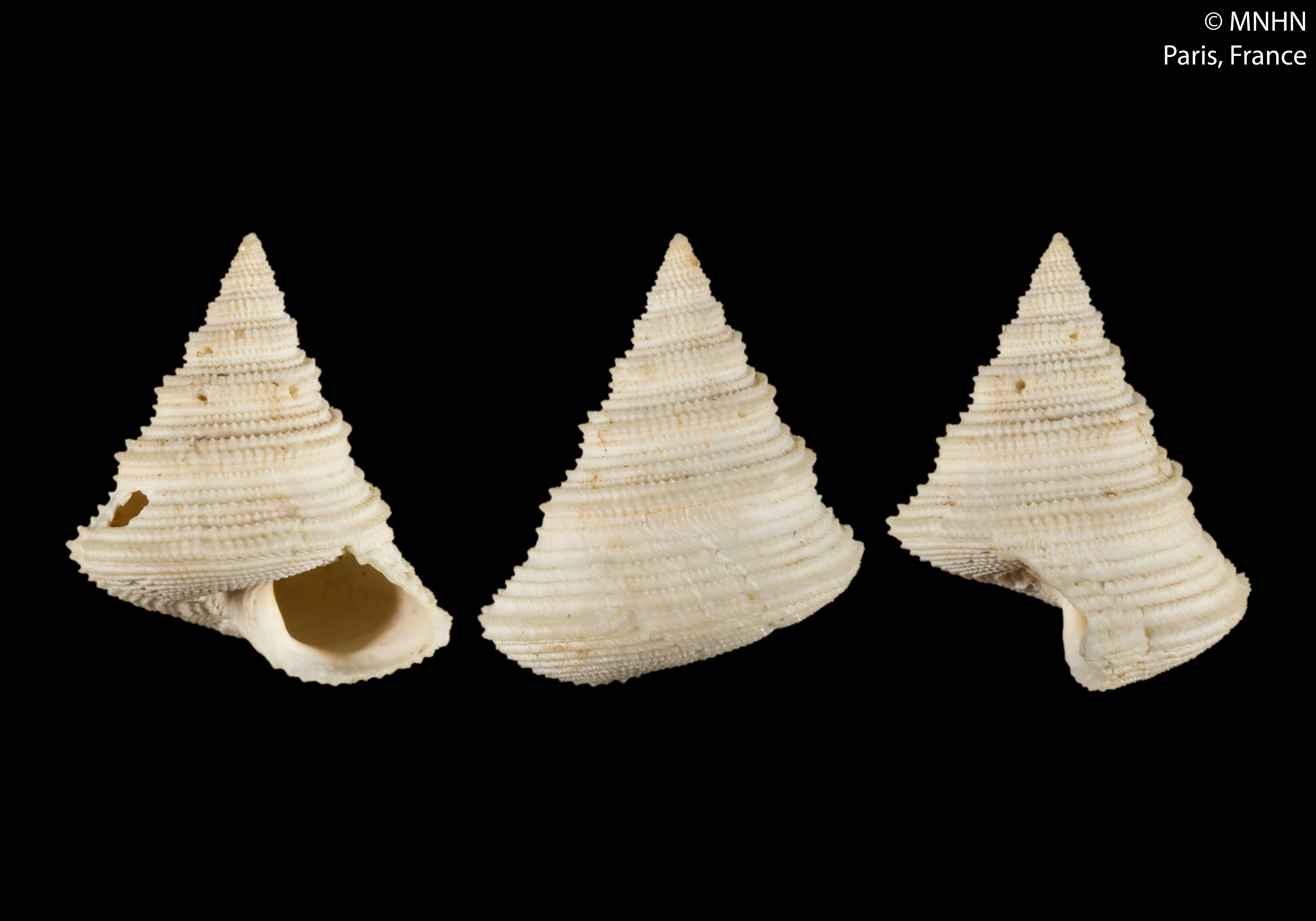
- Shell of Calliostoma arx (holotype at MNHN, Paris)

Scientific classification
- Kingdom: Animalia
- Phylum: Mollusca
- Class: Gastropoda
- Subclass: Vetigastropoda
- Order: Trochida
- Family: Calliostomatidae
- Genus: Calliostoma
- Species: C. arx

Binomial name
- Calliostoma arx Vilvens, 2005

= Calliostoma arx =

Species of gastropod

Calliostoma arx is a species of sea snail, a marine gastropod mollusk in the family Calliostomatidae.

Some authors place this taxon in the subgenus Calliostoma (Benthastelena)

== Description ==
The height of the shell attains 18 mm.

== Distribution ==
This species occurs in the Pacific Ocean off Tonga.
