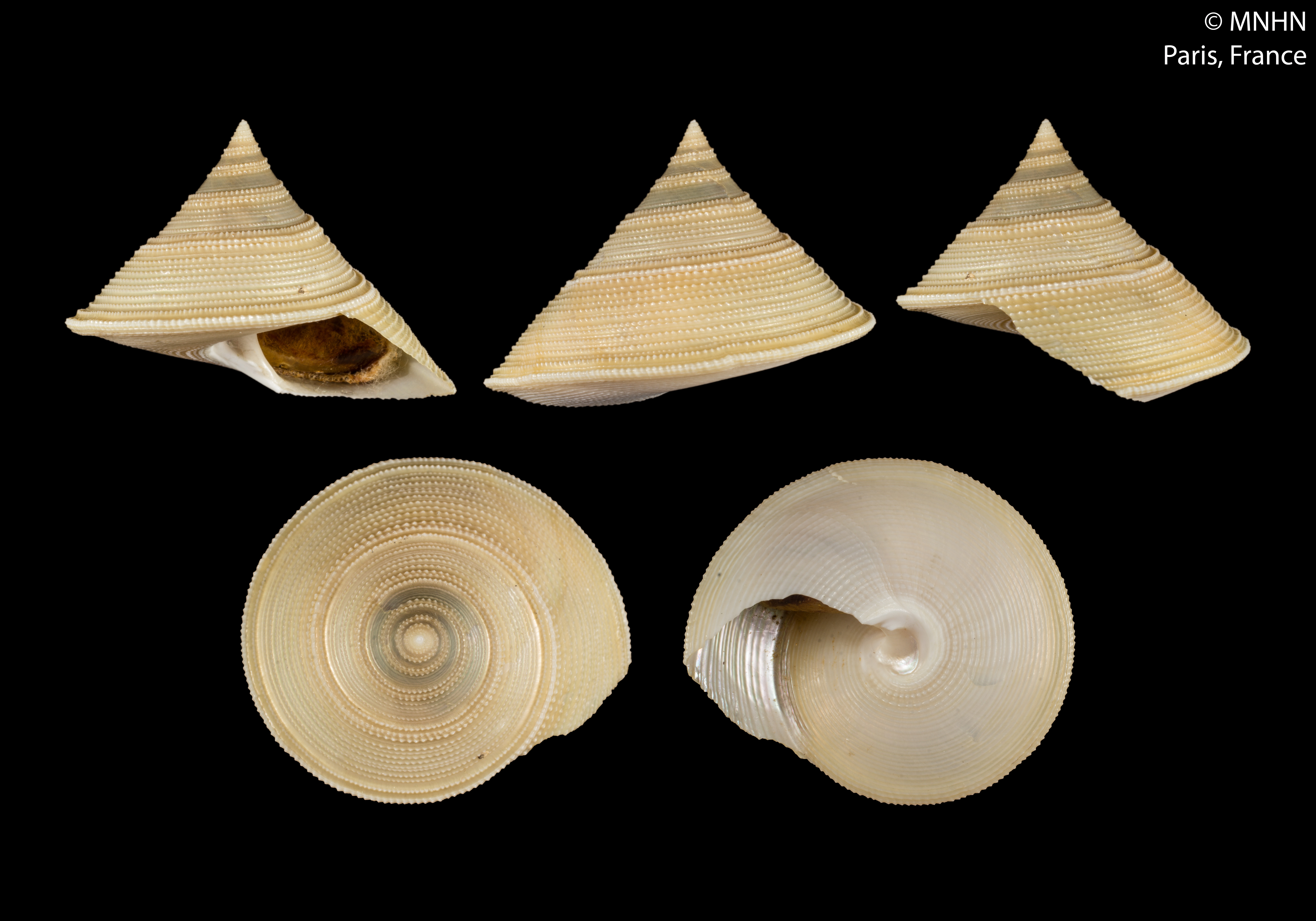
- Shell of Calliostoma madagascarense (holotype at MNHN, Paris)

Scientific classification
- Kingdom: Animalia
- Phylum: Mollusca
- Class: Gastropoda
- Subclass: Vetigastropoda
- Order: Trochida
- Family: Calliostomatidae
- Genus: Calliostoma
- Species: C. madagascarense

Binomial name
- Calliostoma madagascarense Vilvens, Nolf & Verstraeten, 2004

Synonyms
- Calliostoma madagascarensis Vilvens, Nolf & Verstraeten, 2004

= Calliostoma madagascarense =

Species of gastropod

Calliostoma madagascarense is a species of sea snail, a marine gastropod mollusk in the family Calliostomatidae.

Some authors place this taxon in the subgenus Calliostoma (Kombologion).

== Distribution ==
This species occurs in the Indian Ocean off Madagascar.
