= Calliostoma katsunakamai =

Scientific classification
- Kingdom: Animalia
- Phylum: Mollusca
- Class: Gastropoda
- Subclass: Vetigastropoda
- Order: Trochida
- Family: Calliostomatidae
- Genus: Calliostoma
- Species: C. katsunakamai

Binomial name
- Calliostoma katsunakamai Kosuge, 1998

Synonyms
- Calliostoma (Kombologian) katsunakamai Kosuge, 1998

Species of gastropod

Calliostoma katsunakamai is a species of sea snail, a marine gastropod mollusk in the family Calliostomatidae.

Some authors place this taxon in the subgenus Calliostoma (Kombologion).

== Distribution ==
This species occurs in the Indian Ocean and in the Pacific Ocean off Japan and Sumatra
