= Calliostoma dentatum =

Scientific classification
- Kingdom: Animalia
- Phylum: Mollusca
- Class: Gastropoda
- Subclass: Vetigastropoda
- Order: Trochida
- Family: Calliostomatidae
- Genus: Calliostoma
- Species: C. dentatum

Binomial name
- Calliostoma dentatum Quinn, 1992

Species of gastropod

Calliostoma dentatum is a species of sea snail, a marine gastropod mollusk in the family Calliostomatidae.

== Distribution ==
This species occurs in the Gulf of Mexico off Louisiana and Texas at depths between 12 m and 55 m.

== Description ==
The maximum recorded shell length is 8.4 mm.

== Habitat ==
Minimum recorded depth is 12 m. Maximum recorded depth is 55 m.
