= Calliostoma circus =

Scientific classification
- Kingdom: Animalia
- Phylum: Mollusca
- Class: Gastropoda
- Subclass: Vetigastropoda
- Order: Trochida
- Family: Calliostomatidae
- Genus: Calliostoma
- Species: C. circus

Binomial name
- Calliostoma circus Barnard, 1969

Species of gastropod

Calliostoma circus is a species of sea snail, a marine gastropod mollusc in the family Calliostomatidae.
