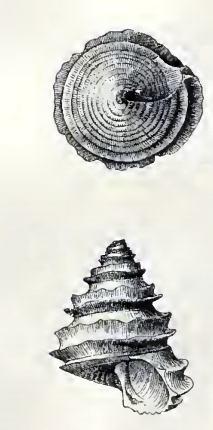
- Original drawing with two views of a shell of Calliostoma circumcinctum

Scientific classification
- Kingdom: Animalia
- Phylum: Mollusca
- Class: Gastropoda
- Subclass: Vetigastropoda
- Order: Trochida
- Family: Calliostomatidae
- Genus: Calliostoma
- Species: C. circumcinctum

Binomial name
- Calliostoma circumcinctum Dall, 1881

= Calliostoma circumcinctum =

Species of gastropod

Calliostoma circumcinctum is a species of sea snail, a marine gastropod mollusk in the family Calliostomatidae.

== Description ==
The maximum recorded shell length is 13 mm.

(Original description by W.H. Dall) The solid, strong, white shell has an elevated, conical shape. It contains seven whorls The small, dextral nucleus is polished and delicately reticulate The other whorls have two sharp, much produced, thin keels These are a little recurved at their edges, and crossed only by most delicate lines of growth. The base of the shell is flattened, ornamented with nine angular ribs, the outermost produced somewhat. There is no umbilicus The aperture is subrectangular, notched by the keels. The simple columella projects somewhat at its anterior end, and is not callous. The appressed suture is distinct, not channelled.

== Distribution ==
Found in the Caribbean Sea and the Gulf of Mexico.

== Habitat ==
Minimum recorded depth is 250 m (820 ft). Maximum recorded depth is 1,472 m (4,829 ft).
