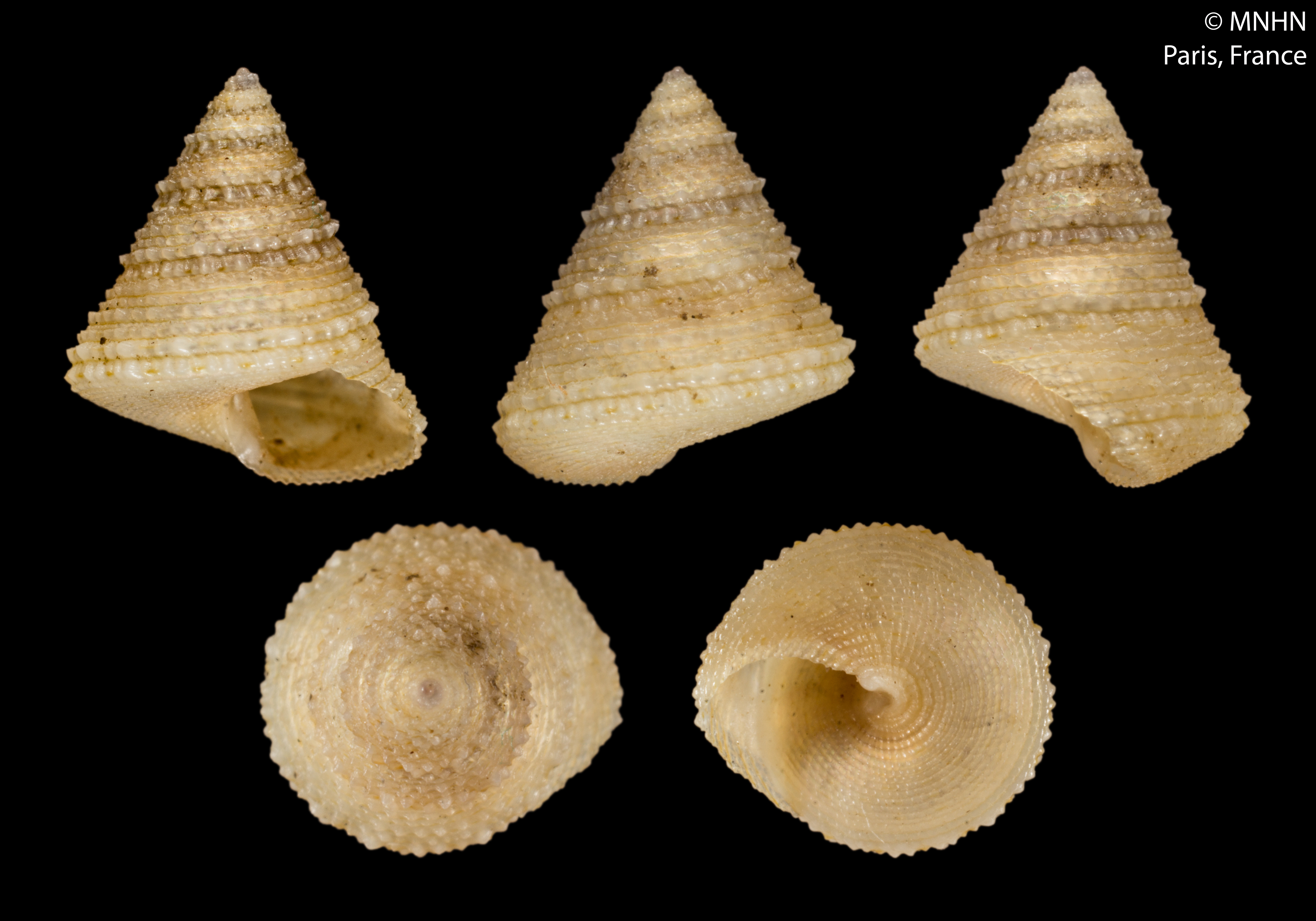
- Shell of Calliostoma gavaldoni (holotype at MNHN, Paris)

Scientific classification
- Kingdom: Animalia
- Phylum: Mollusca
- Class: Gastropoda
- Subclass: Vetigastropoda
- Order: Trochida
- Family: Calliostomatidae
- Genus: Calliostoma
- Species: C. gavaldoni

Binomial name
- Calliostoma gavaldoni Vilvens, 2009

= Calliostoma gavaldoni =

Species of gastropod

Calliostoma gavaldoni is a species of sea snail, a marine gastropod mollusk in the family Calliostomatidae.

== Distribution ==
This species occurs in the Pacific Ocean off Tahiti.
