= Calliostoma soyoae =

Scientific classification
- Kingdom: Animalia
- Phylum: Mollusca
- Class: Gastropoda
- Subclass: Vetigastropoda
- Order: Trochida
- Family: Calliostomatidae
- Genus: Calliostoma
- Species: C. soyoae

Binomial name
- Calliostoma soyoae Ikebe, 1942

Synonyms
- Calliostoma aculeatum soyoae Ikebe, 1942; Calliostoma (Calliostoma) soyoae Ikebe, 1942; Calliostoma (Tristichotrochus) aculeatum soyoae Ikebe, 1942

Species of gastropod

Calliostoma soyoae, common name: Soyo's top shell, is a species of sea snail, a marine gastropod mollusk in the family Calliostomatidae.

Some authors place this taxon in the subgenus Calliostoma (Tristichotrochus).

== Description ==
The size of the shell varies between 10 mm and 25 mm.

== Distribution ==
This marine species occurs off Japan and the Philippines.
