= Calliostoma rubroscalptum =

Scientific classification
- Kingdom: Animalia
- Phylum: Mollusca
- Class: Gastropoda
- Subclass: Vetigastropoda
- Order: Trochida
- Family: Calliostomatidae
- Genus: Calliostoma
- Species: C. rubroscalptum

Binomial name
- Calliostoma rubroscalptum Lee & Wu, 1998

Synonyms
- Calliostoma rubroscalpta Lee & Wu, 1998

Species of gastropod

Calliostoma rubroscalptum is a species of sea snail, a marine gastropod mollusk in the family Calliostomatidae.

== Description ==
The size of the shell varies between 10 mm and 17 mm.

== Distribution ==
This marine species occurs off Taiwan.
