= Calliostoma sanjaimense =

Scientific classification
- Kingdom: Animalia
- Phylum: Mollusca
- Class: Gastropoda
- Subclass: Vetigastropoda
- Order: Trochida
- Family: Calliostomatidae
- Subfamily: Calliostomatinae
- Genus: Calliostoma
- Species: C. sanjaimense

Binomial name
- Calliostoma sanjaimense McLean, 1970

Species of gastropod

Calliostoma sanjaimense is a species of sea snail, a marine gastropod mollusk in the family Calliostomatidae.

== Description ==
Features a shell of moderate size, about 20mm tall and a diameter of 18.4mm. Its shell is yellowish brown in color and contains 7 whorls. The exterior of the shell is wrapped in may beaded chords. It differs from its closest evolutionary relative, C. iridium, due to its sturdier shell as well as more strongly beaded chords on its inner whorls.

== Distribution ==
Found in waters off of Baja California, Mexico
