= Calliostoma debile =

Scientific classification
- Kingdom: Animalia
- Phylum: Mollusca
- Class: Gastropoda
- Subclass: Vetigastropoda
- Order: Trochida
- Family: Calliostomatidae
- Subfamily: Calliostomatinae
- Genus: Calliostoma
- Species: C. debile

Binomial name
- Calliostoma debile Quinn, 1992

Species of gastropod

Calliostoma debile is a species of sea snail, a marine gastropod mollusk in the family Calliostomatidae.

== Description ==
The shell attains a height of 10.3 mm.

== Distribution ==
This marine species occurs off Barbados at a depth between 150 m and 175 m.
