= Calliostoma fernandezi =

Scientific classification
- Kingdom: Animalia
- Phylum: Mollusca
- Class: Gastropoda
- Subclass: Vetigastropoda
- Order: Trochida
- Family: Calliostomatidae
- Subfamily: Calliostomatinae
- Genus: Calliostoma
- Species: C. fernandezi

Binomial name
- Calliostoma fernandezi Princz, 1978

Species of gastropod

Calliostoma fernandezi is a species of sea snail, a marine gastropod mollusk in the family Calliostomatidae.

== Description ==
The size of the shell varies between 9 mm and 29 mm.

== Distribution ==
This species occurs in the Caribbean Sea from Colombia to French Guiana.
