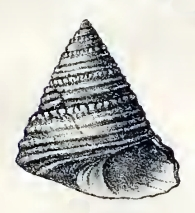
- Drawing of a shell of Calliostoma consimile

Scientific classification
- Kingdom: Animalia
- Phylum: Mollusca
- Class: Gastropoda
- Subclass: Vetigastropoda
- Order: Trochida
- Family: Calliostomatidae
- Subfamily: Calliostomatinae
- Genus: Calliostoma
- Species: C. consimile

Binomial name
- Calliostoma consimile (E. A. Smith, 1881)

Synonyms
- Calliostoma tehuelchum Ihering, 1907; Trochus consimilis E. A. Smith, 1881; Ziziphinus consimile (E. A. Smith, 1881)

= Calliostoma consimile =

Species of gastropod

Calliostoma consimile is a species of sea snail, a marine gastropod mollusk in the family Calliostomatidae.

== Description ==
The size of the shell varies between 10 mm and 20 mm. The pyramidal shell has a very pretty purplish lilac color, encircled with pale transverse ridges. The spire contains seven whorls. The nuclear one is rounded and white. The rest are flat, with three to four strong spiral lirae, whereof the uppermost or the two uppermost, are more or less granulous. The interstices are smooth, with the exception of oblique lines of growth. The suture is marked by a thread-like keel. The body whorl is acutely angled below the middle, with a flattish base, which has two or three sulci near the angle, and two white or pale lilac lirae encircling the umbilical region. The aperture is somewhat obliquely quadrangular. The pearly columella is margined with a white callosity.

== Distribution ==
This marine species occurs in the Southern Atlantic Ocean from Tierra del Fuego to Rio de la Plata, Argentina
