= Calliostoma alternum =

Scientific classification
- Kingdom: Animalia
- Phylum: Mollusca
- Class: Gastropoda
- Subclass: Vetigastropoda
- Order: Trochida
- Family: Calliostomatidae
- Subfamily: Calliostomatinae
- Genus: Calliostoma
- Species: C. alternum

Binomial name
- Calliostoma alternum Quinn, 1992

Species of gastropod

Calliostoma alternum is a species of sea snail, a marine gastropod mollusk in the family Calliostomatidae.

== Description ==
The height of the shell attains 16 mm. The umbilicate shell has a conical shape. It is finely sculptured. The aperture is subquadrate wit thin lips. The rather thin columella is weakly sigmoid and ends in a rounded denticle.

== Distribution ==
This species occurs in the Caribbean Sea off Colombia, Venezuela and Suriname.
