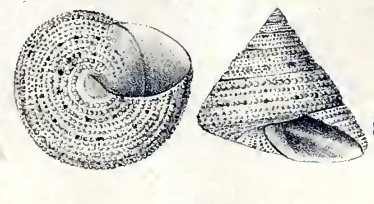
- Drawing with two views of a shell of Calliostoma antonii

Scientific classification
- Kingdom: Animalia
- Phylum: Mollusca
- Class: Gastropoda
- Subclass: Vetigastropoda
- Order: Trochida
- Family: Calliostomatidae
- Subfamily: Calliostomatinae
- Genus: Calliostoma
- Species: C. antonii

Binomial name
- Calliostoma antonii (Koch in Philippi, 1843)

Synonyms
- Trochus antonii Koch in Philippi, 1843; Zizyphinus antonii Koch, 1843

= Calliostoma antonii =

Species of gastropod

Calliostoma antonii is a species of sea snail, a marine gastropod mollusk in the family Calliostomatidae.

== Description ==
The size of the shell varies between 10 mm and 24 mm. The solid, imperforate, thick shell has a conical shape. It is dull flesh colored and granulate. The 7 - 8 flat, margined whorls are encircled by 8 unequal series of granules, the second largest. One is likely to take the second series of granules of the following whorl for a margin. The whorls show about 8 rows of very pretty granules of three sizes. The upper, 3d, 5th and 7th rows have the smallest granules, the 2d the largest. The 4th and 6th have middle sized granules. The periphery consists of several closely crowded rows of the smallest size, and is rounded on the lower whorls. The base of the shell is slightly convex, roughened by a multitude of granulose series. The granules become larger near the center, which is a semicircle, its chord being the columella, formed of inferior, gray nacre. The aperture is rhomboidal. The outer lip has a little distance within a brown streak. The color of the shell is dirty flesh color, with a few very pale brown clouds and fewer dark brown points.

== Distribution ==
This species occurs in the Pacific Ocean from Southern California to Peru.
