= Calliostoma serratulum =

Scientific classification
- Kingdom: Animalia
- Phylum: Mollusca
- Class: Gastropoda
- Subclass: Vetigastropoda
- Order: Trochida
- Family: Calliostomatidae
- Subfamily: Calliostomatinae
- Genus: Calliostoma
- Species: C. serratulum

Binomial name
- Calliostoma serratulum Quinn, 1992

Species of gastropod

Calliostoma serratulum is a species of sea snail, a marine gastropod mollusk in the family Calliostomatidae.

== Description ==
The height of the shell attains 17 mm.

== Distribution ==
This species occurs in the Caribbean Sea from Colombia to Venezuela at depths between 135 m and 165 m.
