= Calliostoma variegatum =

Scientific classification
- Kingdom: Animalia
- Phylum: Mollusca
- Class: Gastropoda
- Subclass: Vetigastropoda
- Order: Trochida
- Family: Calliostomatidae
- Subfamily: Calliostomatinae
- Genus: Calliostoma
- Species: C. variegatum

Binomial name
- Calliostoma variegatum Carpenter, 1864

Species of gastropod

Calliostoma variegatum, common name the variable top shell, is a species of sea snail, a marine gastropod mollusk in the family Calliostomatidae.

== Description ==
The height of the shell attains 25 mm. The small, conical shell is variegated. The nucleus is rosaceous. The six whorls are planate. The sutures are hardly impressed. The spire contains 3 regular, nodulous riblets, the nodules whitish, and subdistant. The interstices are very elegantly rosy. The base of the shell contains 8 lirulae. These are scarcely nodulous, and spotted with rosy.

== Distribution ==
This species occurs in the Pacific Ocean from Alaska to California, USA.
