= Calliostoma halibrectum =

Scientific classification
- Kingdom: Animalia
- Phylum: Mollusca
- Class: Gastropoda
- Subclass: Vetigastropoda
- Order: Trochida
- Family: Calliostomatidae
- Subfamily: Calliostomatinae
- Genus: Calliostoma
- Species: C. halibrectum

Binomial name
- Calliostoma halibrectum Dall, 1927

Species of gastropod

Calliostoma halibrectum is a species of sea snail, a marine gastropod mollusk in the family Calliostomatidae.

== Description ==
The height of the shell attains 9 mm.

== Distribution ==
This species occurs in the Atlantic Ocean off Georgia, USA, at a depth of 538 m.
