= Calliostoma marshalli =

Scientific classification
- Kingdom: Animalia
- Phylum: Mollusca
- Class: Gastropoda
- Subclass: Vetigastropoda
- Order: Trochida
- Family: Calliostomatidae
- Subfamily: Calliostomatinae
- Genus: Calliostoma
- Species: C. marshalli

Binomial name
- Calliostoma marshalli Lowe, 1935

Species of gastropod

Calliostoma marshalli is a species of sea snail, a marine gastropod mollusk in the family Calliostomatidae.

== Description ==
The length of the shell varies between 11 mm and 14 mm.

Their functional group is benthos.

Their feeding type is predatory, specifically on sessile prey.

== Distribution ==
This marine species occurs in the Gulf of California, Western Mexico, to Panama.
