= Calliostoma trachystum =

Scientific classification
- Kingdom: Animalia
- Phylum: Mollusca
- Class: Gastropoda
- Subclass: Vetigastropoda
- Order: Trochida
- Family: Calliostomatidae
- Subfamily: Calliostomatinae
- Genus: Calliostoma
- Species: C. trachystum

Binomial name
- Calliostoma trachystum Dall, 1927

Species of gastropod

Calliostoma trachystum is a species of sea snail, a marine gastropod mollusk in the family Calliostomatidae.

== Description ==
The height of the shell attains 2.5 mm.

== Distribution ==
This species occurs in the Atlantic Ocean off Georgia, USA, at a depth of about 800 m.

== Movement ==
This species like other snails moves by mucus mediated gliding, which means the snails secretes a layer of mucus then its foot contracts in ripple formations—similar to ones in digestion—to propel.

== Feeding ==
This species is a predator on sessile prey.

== Reproduction ==
This species have sexual reproduction.
