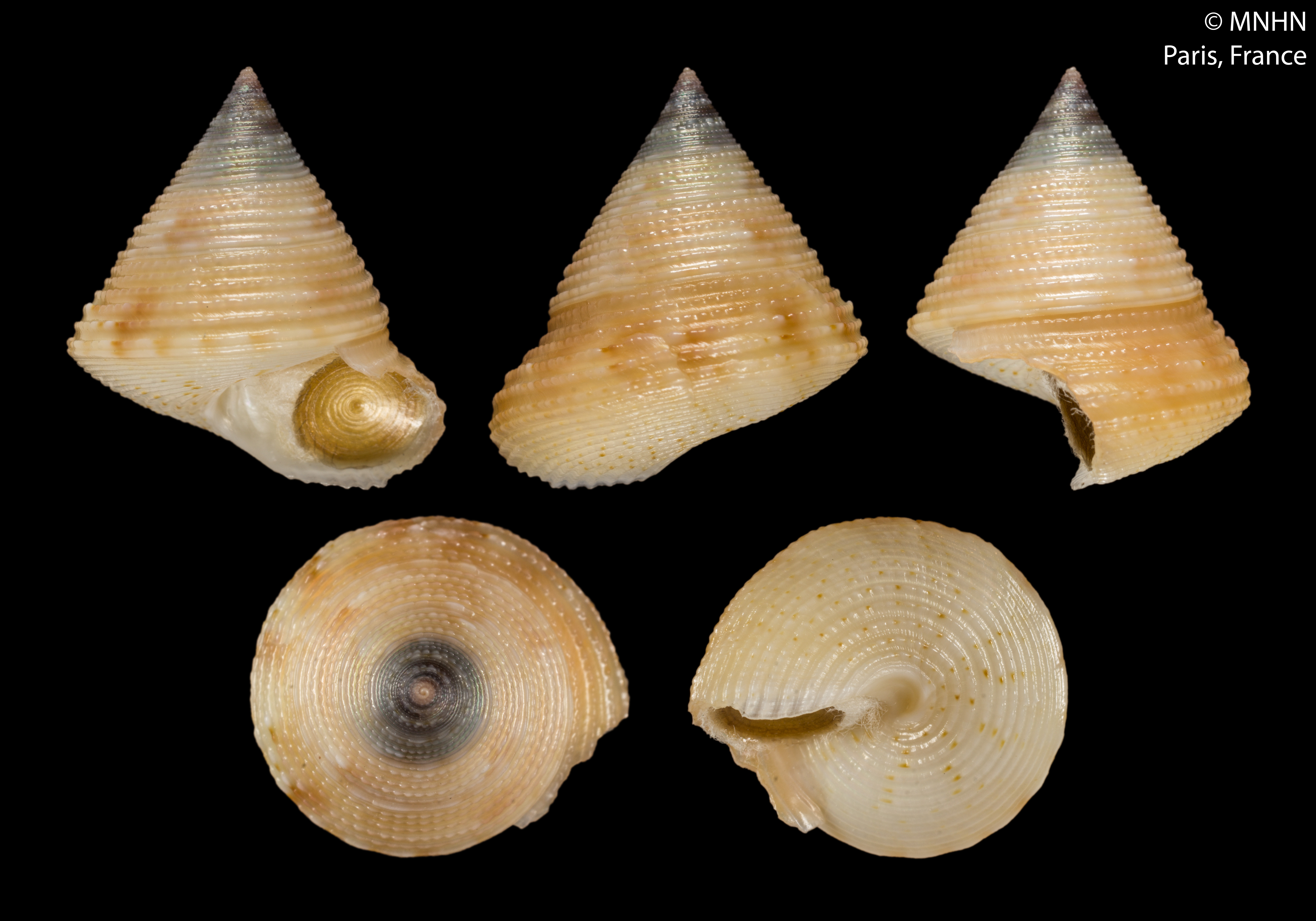
- Shell of Calliostoma jackelynae (holotype at MNHN, Paris)

Scientific classification
- Kingdom: Animalia
- Phylum: Mollusca
- Class: Gastropoda
- Subclass: Vetigastropoda
- Order: Trochida
- Family: Calliostomatidae
- Subfamily: Calliostomatinae
- Genus: Calliostoma
- Species: C. jacquelinae

Binomial name
- Calliostoma jacquelinae McLean, 1970

= Calliostoma jacquelinae =

Species of gastropod

Calliostoma jacquelinae, common name Jacqueline's calliostoma, is a species of sea snail, a marine gastropod mollusk in the family Calliostomatidae.

== Description ==
The size of the shell varies between 6 mm and 12 mm.

== Distribution ==
This species occurs in the Pacific Ocean off the Galapagos Islands and also off the Philippines. It is found in shallow to deep water.
