= Calliostoma purpureum =

Scientific classification
- Kingdom: Animalia
- Phylum: Mollusca
- Class: Gastropoda
- Subclass: Vetigastropoda
- Order: Trochida
- Family: Calliostomatidae
- Subfamily: Calliostomatinae
- Genus: Calliostoma
- Species: C. purpureum

Binomial name
- Calliostoma purpureum Quinn, 1992

Species of gastropod

Calliostoma purpureum is a species of sea snail, a marine gastropod mollusk in the family Calliostomatidae.

== Description ==
The size of the shell varies between 11 and 27 mm (0.43 and 1.06 in).

== Distribution ==
This species occurs in the Caribbean Sea, off Trinidad and off the Bahamas.
