= Calliostoma tittarium =

Scientific classification
- Kingdom: Animalia
- Phylum: Mollusca
- Class: Gastropoda
- Subclass: Vetigastropoda
- Order: Trochida
- Family: Calliostomatidae
- Subfamily: Calliostomatinae
- Genus: Calliostoma
- Species: C. tittarium

Binomial name
- Calliostoma tittarium Dall, 1927

Species of gastropod

Calliostoma tittarium is a species of sea snail, a marine gastropod mollusk in the family Calliostomatidae.

== Description ==
The length of the shell attains 3.5 mm.

== Distribution ==
This shell occurs in the Atlantic Ocean off Georgia, USA, at depths between 538 m and 805 m.
