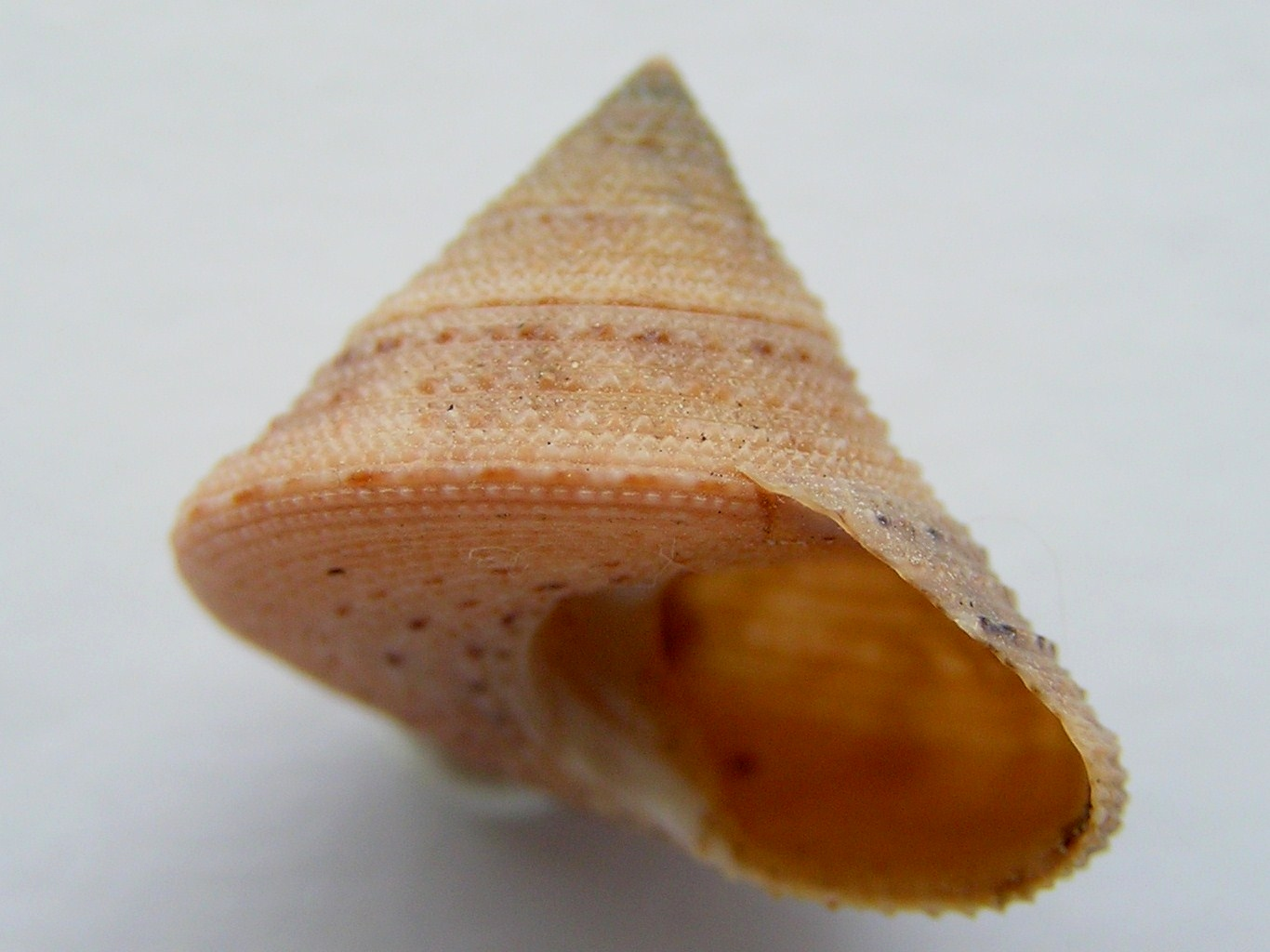
- Apertural view of a shell of Calliostoma aequisculptum

Scientific classification
- Kingdom: Animalia
- Phylum: Mollusca
- Class: Gastropoda
- Subclass: Vetigastropoda
- Order: Trochida
- Family: Calliostomatidae
- Subfamily: Calliostomatinae
- Genus: Calliostoma
- Species: C. aequisculptum

Binomial name
- Calliostoma aequisculptum Carpenter, 1865

= Calliostoma aequisculptum =

Species of gastropod

Calliostoma aequisculptum is a species of sea snail, a marine gastropod mollusk in the family Calliostomatidae.

== Description ==
The length of the shell varies between 10 mm and 25 mm.

== Distribution ==
This marine shell occurs in the Pacific Ocean from Mazatlan, Mexico to Peru.
