= Calliostoma bermudense =

Scientific classification
- Kingdom: Animalia
- Phylum: Mollusca
- Class: Gastropoda
- Subclass: Vetigastropoda
- Order: Trochida
- Family: Calliostomatidae
- Subfamily: Calliostomatinae
- Genus: Calliostoma
- Species: C. bermudense

Binomial name
- Calliostoma bermudense Quinn, 1992

Species of gastropod

Calliostoma bermudense is a species of sea snail, a marine gastropod mollusk in the family Calliostomatidae.

== Description ==
The height of the shell attains 13 mm.

== Distribution ==
This species occurs in the Atlantic Ocean off the Bermudas at a depth of about 80 m.
