= Calliostoma nepheloide =

Scientific classification
- Kingdom: Animalia
- Phylum: Mollusca
- Class: Gastropoda
- Subclass: Vetigastropoda
- Order: Trochida
- Family: Calliostomatidae
- Subfamily: Calliostomatinae
- Genus: Calliostoma
- Species: C. nepheloide

Binomial name
- Calliostoma nepheloide Dall, 1913

Species of gastropod

Calliostoma nepheloide, common name the Nephelo top shell, is a species of sea snail, a marine gastropod mollusk in the family Calliostomatidae.

== Description ==
The size of the shell varies between 14 mm and 28 mm. The trochiform shell has an acute-conical shape. trochiform. Its color is yellowish, with radiating dark-purple nebulosities and flammules. The white, glassy, minute nucleus is more or less inverted. The spire consists of about nine whorls. A nepionic (= the whorls immediately following the embryonic whorls) whorl and a half follows, with three spiral, latterly beaded cords. The remaining sculpture comprises a strong prominently beaded cord at the periphery immediately in front of which the suture is laid. On the body whorl between the periphery and the suture behind it, are about a dozen threads smaller than that at the periphery but equally and uniformly beaded, with subequal, smooth interspaces, and mostly alternating in size. There is no obvious axial sculpture. The base of the shell is bordered by a cord (without beading) of the middle size, between which and the center of the base there are 18 to 20 flattish straplike spirals. These are faintly irregularly undulated and with subequal or narrower interspaces, except the three or four nearest the columella which are larger, more distant, and with more or less obscure nodulation. The base of the shell is only slightly convex. The white columella is arcuate, with an obscure ridge around the imperforate umbilical region, ending at the anterior end of the pillar in a nodulous swelling. The aperture of the type specimen is broken, but evidently subquadrate with a thin, simple, outer lip.

== Distribution ==
This species occurs in the Pacific Ocean from Mexico to Panama.
