= Calliostoma fucosum =

Scientific classification
- Kingdom: Animalia
- Phylum: Mollusca
- Class: Gastropoda
- Subclass: Vetigastropoda
- Order: Trochida
- Family: Calliostomatidae
- Subfamily: Calliostomatinae
- Genus: Calliostoma
- Species: C. fucosum

Binomial name
- Calliostoma fucosum Quinn, 1992

Synonyms
- Ziziphinus leanus auct. non C. B. Adams, 1852

Species of gastropod

Calliostoma fucosum is a species of sea snail, a marine gastropod mollusk in the family Calliostomatidae.

== Description ==
The length of the shell varies between 7 mm and 13 mm.

== Distribution ==
This species occurs in the Caribbean Sea off Colombia and Venezuela at depths between 7 m and 20 m.
