= Calliostoma gordanum =

Scientific classification
- Kingdom: Animalia
- Phylum: Mollusca
- Class: Gastropoda
- Subclass: Vetigastropoda
- Order: Trochida
- Family: Calliostomatidae
- Subfamily: Calliostomatinae
- Genus: Calliostoma
- Species: C. gordanum

Binomial name
- Calliostoma gordanum McLean, 1970

Synonyms
- Calliostoma (Calliostoma) gordanum McLean, 1970

Species of gastropod

Calliostoma gordanum is a species of sea snail, a marine gastropod mollusk in the family Calliostomatidae.

== Description ==
The height of the shell attains 25 mm.

== Distribution ==
This marine species occurs off Baja California, Mexico.
