= Calliostoma funiculatum =

Scientific classification
- Kingdom: Animalia
- Phylum: Mollusca
- Class: Gastropoda
- Subclass: Vetigastropoda
- Order: Trochida
- Family: Calliostomatidae
- Subfamily: Calliostomatinae
- Genus: Calliostoma
- Species: C. funiculatum

Binomial name
- Calliostoma funiculatum Ardovini, 2011

Species of gastropod

Calliostoma funiculatum is a species of sea snail, a marine gastropod mollusk in the family Calliostomatidae.

== Distribution ==
This species occurs in the Mediterranean Sea off Sicily, Italy.
