= Calliostoma boscianum =

Scientific classification
- Kingdom: Animalia
- Phylum: Mollusca
- Class: Gastropoda
- Subclass: Vetigastropoda
- Order: Trochida
- Superfamily: Trochoidea
- Family: Calliostomatidae
- Subfamily: Calliostomatinae
- Genus: Calliostoma
- Species: †C. boscianum

Binomial name
- †Calliostoma boscianum (Brongniart, 1823)

Synonyms
- Calliostoma bosciana (Brongniart, 1823); Trochus boscianus Brongniart, 1823; Trochus boscianus aquensis Grateloup, 1845; Trochus noe d'Orbigny, 1852

Extinct species of gastropod

Calliostoma boscianum is an extinct species of sea snail, a marine gastropod mollusk, in the family Calliostomatidae within the superfamily Trochoidea, the top snails, turban snails and their allies.
