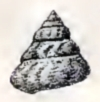
- Drawing of a shell of Calliostoma ocellatum

Scientific classification
- Kingdom: Animalia
- Phylum: Mollusca
- Class: Gastropoda
- Subclass: Vetigastropoda
- Order: Trochida
- Family: Calliostomatidae
- Subfamily: Calliostomatinae
- Genus: Calliostoma
- Species: C. ocellatum

Binomial name
- Calliostoma ocellatum (Reeve, 1863)

Synonyms
- Calliostoma (Calliostoma) ocellatum Reeve, 1863; Zizyphinus ocellatus Reeve, 1863 (original description)

= Calliostoma ocellatum =

Species of gastropod

Calliostoma ocellatum is a species of sea snail, a marine gastropod mollusk in the family Calliostomatidae.

== Description ==
The shell has a rather broadly conical shape. It is reddish fulvous, ocellated with brown-shaded white spots. The whorls are concavely impressed round the upper parts, then rounded, and spirally grain-ridged throughout. The shell is rather constricted below the sutures, then rounded and ocellated with shaded opaque-white spots.

== Distribution ==
This species occurs in the Indian Ocean off Mauritius.
