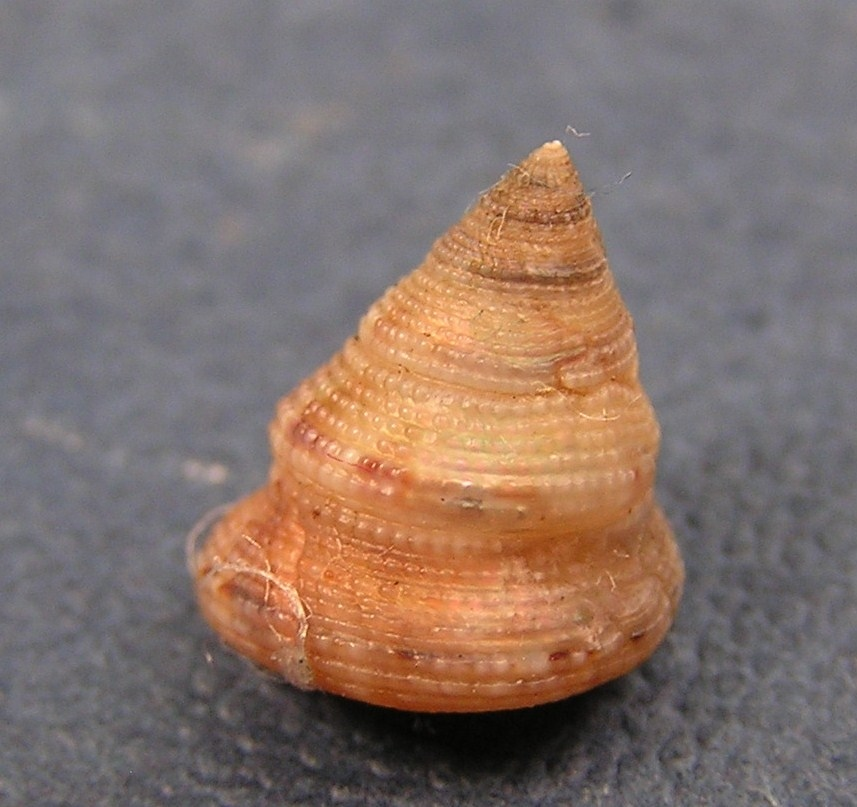
- View of a shell of Calliostoma leanum

Scientific classification
- Kingdom: Animalia
- Phylum: Mollusca
- Class: Gastropoda
- Subclass: Vetigastropoda
- Order: Trochida
- Family: Calliostomatidae
- Subfamily: Calliostomatinae
- Genus: Calliostoma
- Species: C. leanum

Binomial name
- Calliostoma leanum (C. B. Adams, 1852)

Synonyms
- Calliostoma macandreae Carpenter, P.P., 1856; Trochus leanum C. B. Adams, 1852 (basionym); Trochus macandreae Carpenter, 1857

= Calliostoma leanum =

Species of gastropod

Calliostoma leanum, common name the pretty mouth, is a species of sea snail, a marine gastropod mollusk in the family Calliostomatidae.

C.B. Adams names this species in honor of Isaac Lea, Esq., of Philadelphia.

== Description ==
The height of the shell varies between 8 mm and 13 mm. The conic shell is well elevated. Its color is pale yellowish or reddish-brown, with broad dark brown oblique flammules. It is anteriorly somewhat articu-ated with red and yellowish-white in fine concentric lines with many elevated granulous spiral lines, of which three larger are next above the suture. The outlines of the spire are nearly rectilinear. The apex is acute. There are nine whorls. These are planulate or concave next below the suture, which is moderately impressed. The body whorl is subplanulate anteriorly. The aperture is subquadrate. The outer lip is thin. The columella is obliquely produced and nearly straight. The shell lacks an umbilicus.

== Distribution ==
This species occurs in the Pacific Ocean off California, Mexico, Panama and the Galapagos Islands.
