= Calliostoma santacruzanum =

Scientific classification
- Kingdom: Animalia
- Phylum: Mollusca
- Class: Gastropoda
- Subclass: Vetigastropoda
- Order: Trochida
- Family: Calliostomatidae
- Subfamily: Calliostomatinae
- Genus: Calliostoma
- Species: C. santacruzanum

Binomial name
- Calliostoma santacruzanum McLean, 1970

Species of gastropod

Calliostoma santacruzanum is a species of sea snail, a marine gastropod mollusk in the family Calliostomatidae.

== Description ==
The length of the shell attains 7 mm.

== Distribution ==
This species occurs in the Pacific Ocean off the Galapagos Islands and off Cocos Island, Costa Rica.
