= Calliostoma nudiusculum =

Scientific classification
- Kingdom: Animalia
- Phylum: Mollusca
- Class: Gastropoda
- Subclass: Vetigastropoda
- Order: Trochida
- Family: Calliostomatidae
- Subfamily: Calliostomatinae
- Genus: Calliostoma
- Species: C. nudiusculum

Binomial name
- Calliostoma nudiusculum (Martens, 1881)

Synonyms
- Trochus (Margarita) nudiusculus Martens, 1881 (original combination)

Species of gastropod

Calliostoma nudiusculum is a species of sea snail, a marine gastropod mollusk in the family Calliostomatidae.

== Description ==
The height of the shell attains 15 mm.

Its functional group is Benthos.

Its feeding type is predatory, specifically on sessile prey.

== Distribution ==
This species occurs in the Atlantic Ocean off Argentina at depths between 60 m and 100 m. The perforated, bicarinate, pearly shell has a conical shape. The 4½ whorls are gradate. The first 2 are yellowish, smooth, the following ones denuded-pearly. Beneath the suture the shell is sculptured with a series of nodules and smooth spiral lirae, few in number or evanescent. The body whorl contains elevated concentric lines on the base, stronger on the periphery, and radiating impressed lines. The aperture is rhomboid-rounded. The columellar margin is concave, thickened, below a little expanded, edentulous.
