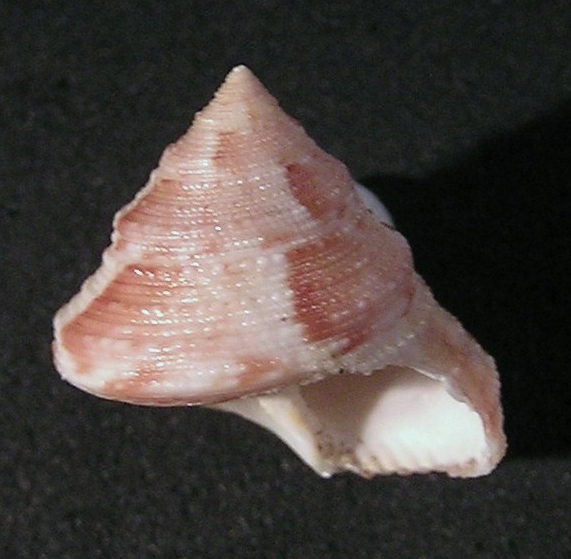
- Apertural view of a shell of Calliostoma adspersum

Scientific classification
- Kingdom: Animalia
- Phylum: Mollusca
- Class: Gastropoda
- Subclass: Vetigastropoda
- Order: Trochida
- Family: Calliostomatidae
- Subfamily: Calliostomatinae
- Genus: Calliostoma
- Species: C. adspersum

Binomial name
- Calliostoma adspersum (Philippi, 1851)

Synonyms
- Trochus adspersus Beck; Trochus eximius Philippi, Zizyphinium adspersum Beck

= Calliostoma adspersum =

Species of gastropod

Calliostoma adspersum, common name the spotted Brazilian top shell, is a species of sea snail, a marine gastropod mollusk in the family Calliostomatidae.

== Description ==
The length of the shell varies between 16 mm and 28 mm. The conical shell is imperforate, whitish-gray, flammulated with rufous, and encircled by delicate granulate threads. The plane whorls are angulated with a sharp carina a little above the sutures, the last one biangulate with a second carina. The sculpture of the upper surface consists of five, fine thread-like or hair-like granulate spirals, the last forming the sharp carina over the suture. There are in the interstices finer granulose lines. The base of the shell is a little convex with 9 to 10 concentric, little elevated smooth lirae, nearly as broad as their interstices. The aperture is rhomboidal with rounded angles. The oblique columella is cylindrical and subdentate at its base, bounded by a pit at its insertion.

== Distribution ==
This marine species occurs from Colombia to Southern Brazil.
