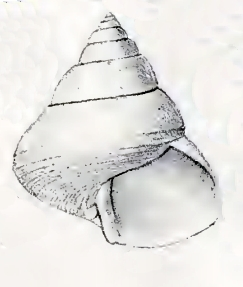
- Drawing with an apertural view of a shell of Calliostoma platinum

Scientific classification
- Kingdom: Animalia
- Phylum: Mollusca
- Class: Gastropoda
- Subclass: Vetigastropoda
- Order: Trochida
- Family: Calliostomatidae
- Subfamily: Calliostomatinae
- Genus: Calliostoma
- Species: C. platinum

Binomial name
- Calliostoma platinum Dall, 1890

= Calliostoma platinum =

Species of gastropod

Calliostoma platinum is a species of sea snail, a marine gastropod mollusk in the family Calliostomatidae.

== Description ==
The size of the shell varies between 25 mm and 34 mm. The imperforate, very thin, nearly smooth shell has a conical shape. It is soiled white with a delicate tint of sea-green on the last whorl. The surface is slightly shining. The spire is conical, its outlines a trifle concave;. It contains 8 whorls. The dextral apex is subimmersed. The first two whorls are quite convex, the following whorls slightly convex. The sutures are linear. The body whorl has a delicate carina at the otherwise blunt periphery. Above this, parallel with it, there is a narrow raised cord which does not extend above the lower whorl, and will probably be found to be quite inconstant. The whole upper surface of the whorls is traversed by numerous scarcely perceptible spirals. The base of the shell is slightly convex, and has close, unequal spiral striae, coarser near the axis and circumference. The rather large aperture is subquadrate, beautifully iridescent within. The thin outer lip is fragile. The vertical, pearly columella is cylindrical and not toothed at its base.

== Distribution ==
This species occurs in the Pacific Ocean off California, USA.
