= Calliostoma agalma =

Scientific classification
- Kingdom: Animalia
- Phylum: Mollusca
- Class: Gastropoda
- Subclass: Vetigastropoda
- Order: Trochida
- Superfamily: Trochoidea
- Family: Calliostomatidae
- Subfamily: Calliostomatinae
- Genus: Calliostoma
- Species: C. agalma

Binomial name
- Calliostoma agalma Schwengel, 1942;

Synonyms
- Dymares agalma (Schwengel, 1942)

Species of gastropod

Calliostoma agalma is a species of sea snail, a marine gastropod mollusk, in the family Calliostomatidae within the superfamily Trochoidea, the top snails, turban snails and their allies.
