= Calliostoma aulicum =

Scientific classification
- Kingdom: Animalia
- Phylum: Mollusca
- Class: Gastropoda
- Subclass: Vetigastropoda
- Order: Trochida
- Family: Calliostomatidae
- Subfamily: Calliostomatinae
- Genus: Calliostoma
- Species: C. aulicum

Binomial name
- Calliostoma aulicum Quinn, 1992

Species of gastropod

Calliostoma aulicum is a species of sea snail, a marine gastropod mollusk in the family Calliostomatidae.

== Description ==
The height of the shell attains 16 mm. The umbilical shell has a conical shape and is finely sculptured. The teleoconch contains 7.5 concave whorls. The color of the shell is ivory with a few, faint patches of golden brown.

== Distribution ==
This species occurs in the Caribbean Sea off Panama, eastern Venezuela, Suriname and Trinidad at depths between 12 mm and 48 m.
