= Calliostoma mcleani =

Scientific classification
- Kingdom: Animalia
- Phylum: Mollusca
- Class: Gastropoda
- Subclass: Vetigastropoda
- Order: Trochida
- Family: Calliostomatidae
- Subfamily: Calliostomatinae
- Genus: Calliostoma
- Species: C. mcleani

Binomial name
- Calliostoma mcleani Shasky & Campbell, 1964

Species of gastropod

Calliostoma mcleani, common name McLean's calliostoma, is a species of sea snail, a marine gastropod mollusk in the family Calliostomatidae.

== Description ==
The shell is approximately 10 mm at its aperture.

== Distribution ==
This species occurs in the Pacific Ocean in the shallow subtidal zone off California to Ecuador and off the Galápagos Islands.
