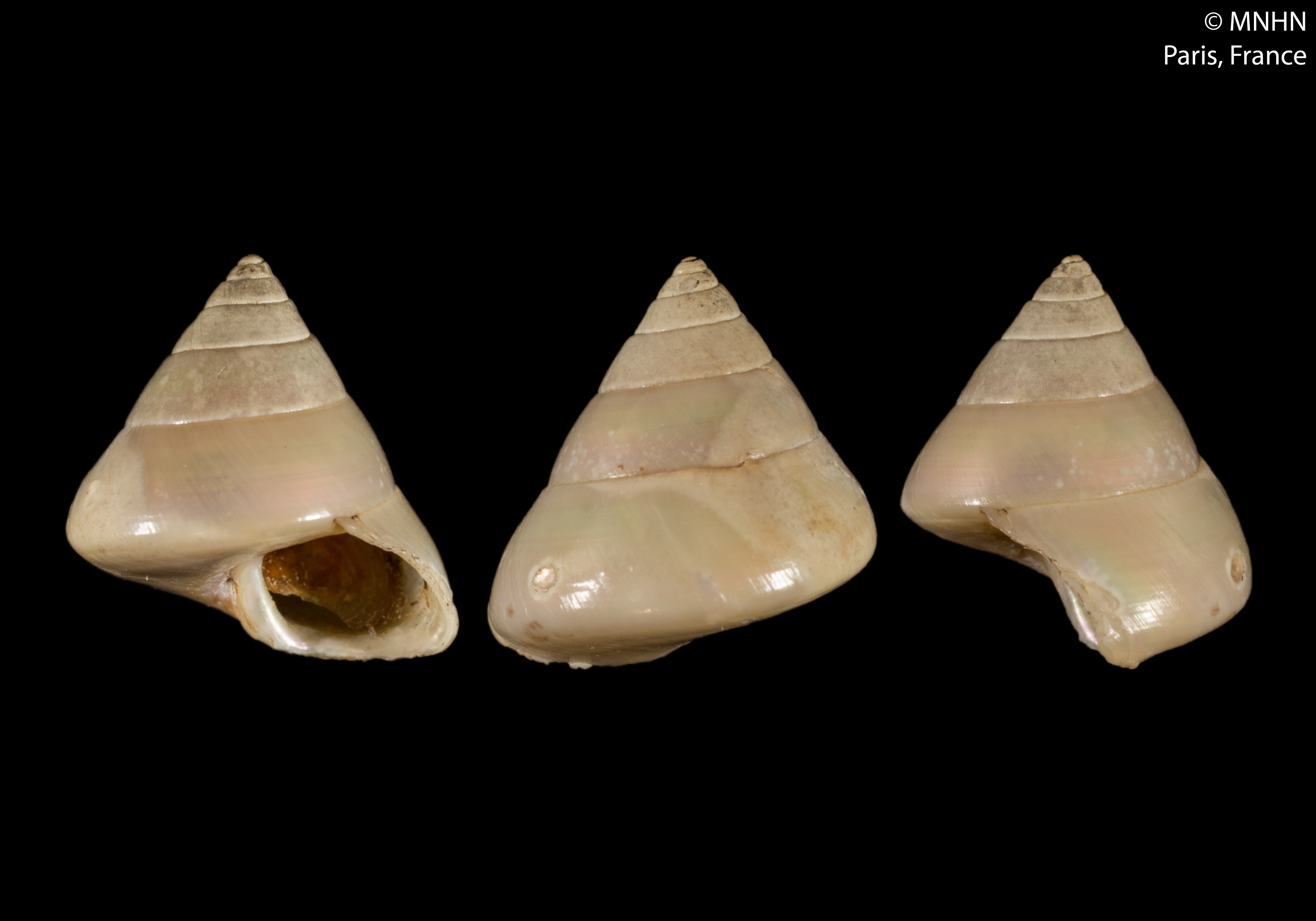
- Shell of Calliostoma nudum (syntype at MNHN, Paris)

Scientific classification
- Kingdom: Animalia
- Phylum: Mollusca
- Class: Gastropoda
- Subclass: Vetigastropoda
- Order: Trochida
- Family: Calliostomatidae
- Subfamily: Calliostomatinae
- Genus: Calliostoma
- Species: C. nudum

Binomial name
- Calliostoma nudum (Philippi, 1845)

Synonyms
- Calliostoma dozei Mabille & Rochebrune, 1889; Calliostoma falklandicum Strebel, 1908; Calliostoma flavidocarneum Strebel, 1905; Calliostoma hahni Rochebrune & Mabille, 1889; Calliostoma kophameli Strebel, 1905; Calliostoma optimum Rochebrune & Mabille, 1889; Calliostoma roseocinctum Strebel, 1905; Calliostoma senius Mabille & Rochebrune, 1889; Calliostoma venustulum Strebel, 1908; Trochus nudus Philippi, 1845 (original combination)

= Calliostoma nudum =

Species of gastropod

Calliostoma nudum is a species of sea snail, a marine gastropod mollusc in the family Calliostomatidae.

== Description ==
The size of the shell varies between 6 mm and 16 mm.

== Distribution ==
This marine species occurs off Argentina, Tierra del Fuego, Straits of Magellan, and Chile.
