= Calliostoma guesti =

Scientific classification
- Kingdom: Animalia
- Phylum: Mollusca
- Class: Gastropoda
- Subclass: Vetigastropoda
- Order: Trochida
- Family: Calliostomatidae
- Subfamily: Calliostomatinae
- Genus: Calliostoma
- Species: C. guesti

Binomial name
- Calliostoma guesti Quinn, 1992

Species of gastropod

Calliostoma guesti is a species of sea snail, a marine gastropod mollusk in the family Calliostomatidae.

== Description ==
The length of the shell attains 28 mm.

== Distribution ==
This species occurs in the Atlantic Ocean off the Bermudas at a depth of 200 m.
