= Calliostoma scurra =

Scientific classification
- Kingdom: Animalia
- Phylum: Mollusca
- Class: Gastropoda
- Subclass: Vetigastropoda
- Order: Trochida
- Family: Calliostomatidae
- Subfamily: Calliostomatinae
- Genus: Calliostoma
- Species: C. scurra

Binomial name
- Calliostoma scurra Quinn, 1992

Species of gastropod

Calliostoma scurra is a species of sea snail, a marine gastropod mollusk in the family Calliostomatidae.

== Description ==
The size of the shell varies between 12 mm and 14 mm.

== Distribution ==
This species occurs in the Caribbean Sea off Venezuela and Suriname at depths between 18 m and 77 m.
