= Calliostoma hirtum =

Scientific classification
- Kingdom: Animalia
- Phylum: Mollusca
- Class: Gastropoda
- Subclass: Vetigastropoda
- Order: Trochida
- Family: Calliostomatidae
- Subfamily: Calliostomatinae
- Genus: Calliostoma
- Species: C. hirtum

Binomial name
- Calliostoma hirtum Quinn, 1992

Species of gastropod

Calliostoma hirtum is a species of sea snail, a marine gastropod mollusk in the family Calliostomatidae.

== Description ==
The height of the shell attains 18 mm.

== Distribution ==
This marine Vetigastropod species occurs off the Dominican Republic at a depth of 530 m.
