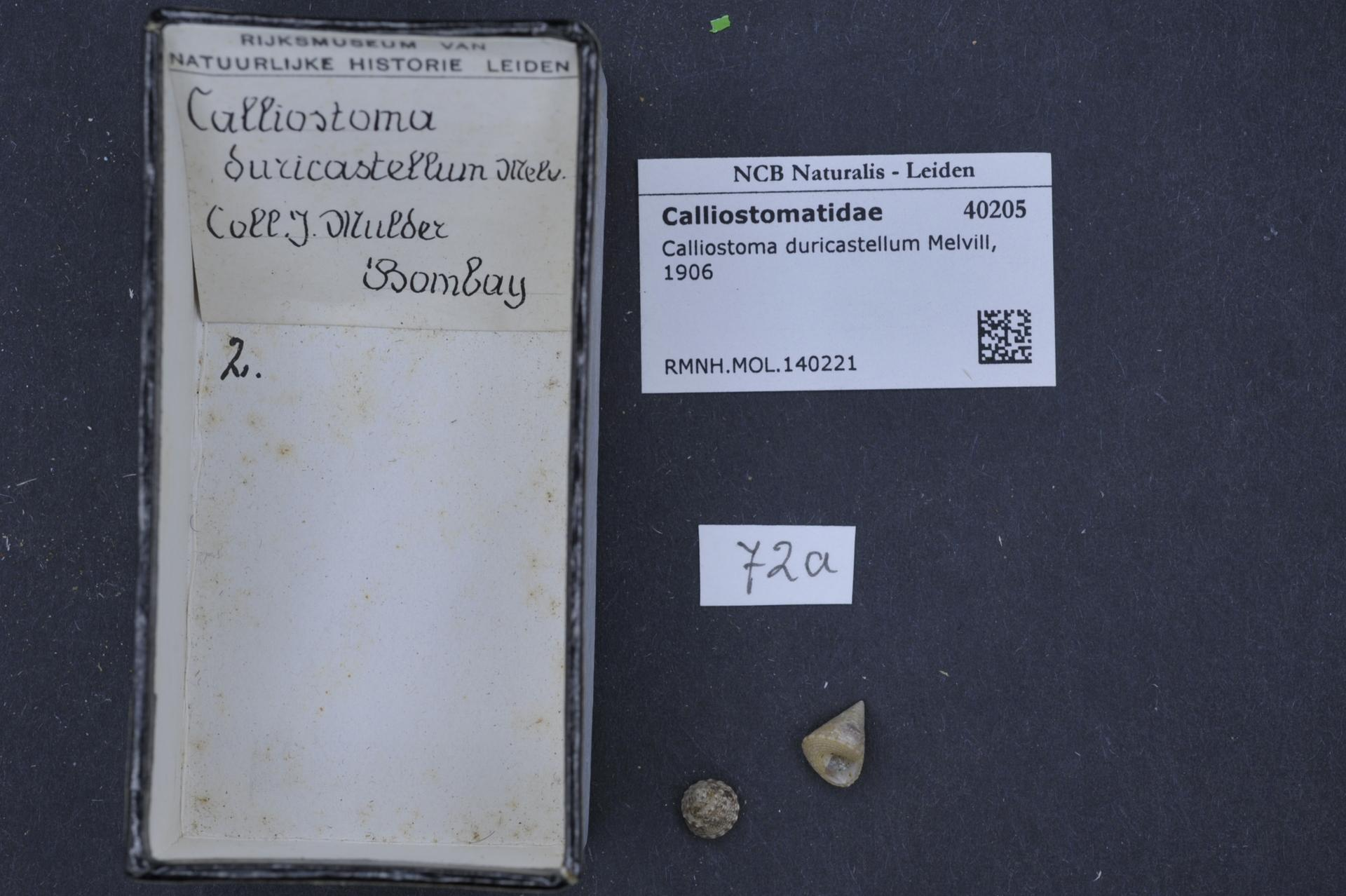

Scientific classification
- Kingdom: Animalia
- Phylum: Mollusca
- Class: Gastropoda
- Subclass: Vetigastropoda
- Order: Trochida
- Family: Calliostomatidae
- Subfamily: Calliostomatinae
- Genus: Calliostoma
- Species: C. duricastellum

Binomial name
- Calliostoma duricastellum Melvill, 1898

Synonyms
- Calliostoma (Calliostoma) duricastellum Melvill, 1898

= Calliostoma duricastellum =

Species of gastropod

Calliostoma duricastellum is a species of sea snail, a marine gastropod mollusk in the family Calliostomatidae.
