= Calliostoma virginicum =

Scientific classification
- Kingdom: Animalia
- Phylum: Mollusca
- Class: Gastropoda
- Subclass: Vetigastropoda
- Order: Trochida
- Superfamily: Trochoidea
- Family: Calliostomatidae
- Subfamily: Calliostomatinae
- Genus: Calliostoma
- Species: †C. virginicum

Binomial name
- †Calliostoma virginicum (Conrad, 1875)

Synonyms
- Zizyphinus virginicus Conrad, 1875;

Extinct species of gastropod

Calliostoma virginicum is an extinct species of sea snail, a marine gastropod mollusk, in the family Calliostomatidae within the superfamily Trochoidea, the top snails, turban snails and their allies.
