= Calliostoma nanshaense =

Scientific classification
- Kingdom: Animalia
- Phylum: Mollusca
- Class: Gastropoda
- Subclass: Vetigastropoda
- Order: Trochida
- Family: Calliostomatidae
- Subfamily: Calliostomatinae
- Genus: Calliostoma
- Species: C. nanshaense

Binomial name
- Calliostoma nanshaense Dong, 2002

Synonyms
- Calliostoma nanshaensis [sic] (basionym; incorrect gender ending)

Species of gastropod

Calliostoma nanshaense is a species of sea snail, a marine gastropod mollusk in the family Calliostomatidae.

== Distribution ==
The type locality is "Nansha Islands" (=Spratly Islands, South China Sea).
