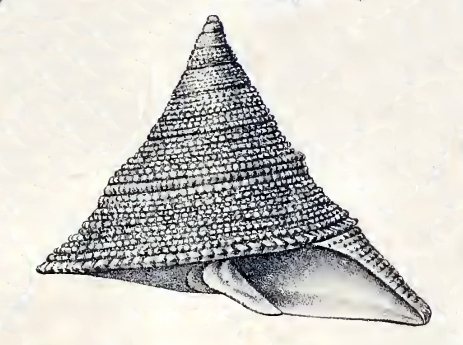
- Drawing with an apertural view of a shell of Calliostoma aurora

Scientific classification
- Kingdom: Animalia
- Phylum: Mollusca
- Class: Gastropoda
- Subclass: Vetigastropoda
- Order: Trochida
- Family: Calliostomatidae
- Subfamily: Calliostomatinae
- Genus: Calliostoma
- Species: C. aurora

Binomial name
- Calliostoma aurora Dall, 1888

= Calliostoma aurora =

Species of gastropod

Calliostoma aurora, common name the dawn top shell, is a species of sea snail, a marine gastropod mollusk in the family Calliostomatidae.

== Description ==
The height of the shell attains 28 mm. The delicate shell contains nine whorls. It is acutely pointed. Its color above varies from light pink to straw color; below it has a light cream color. The sharp peripheral carina is lighter than the rest of the upper surface. The general outline from nucleus to basal periphery is somewhat concave. The base of the shell is concavely excavated within the margin, slightly convex toward the center. The smooth nucleus is whitish. The whorls are gently rounded, closely appressed to the almost invisible suture and excavated in front of it. The body whorl is flatter above, more rapidly enlarged at the periphery. The sculpture consists of small regular waves on the carina, about six in a space of 5 mm, giving a minutely scalloped outline. Behind this is a strong nodulous thread, revolving like a string of small uniform beads. Then follows a more slender thread more finely beaded. In all eleven regularly alternating revolving threads at the beginning of the last whorl. This sculpture is very uniform all over the surface. The base is polished, smooth, except for two or three faint beaded lines and grooves about the columella, and faint longitudinal and transverse growth markings. The aperture is nearly twice as wide as high. The lower lip shows a beautiful concavely arched outline, falling much behind the upper one. The margin is simple, except for sculpture marks. The short columella is arcuated, pearly, simple, ending in a slight point.

The marked features are the concavity of the slope of the spire and of the outer portion of the base, the polished base contrasting with the regularly beaded upper surface, and the delicately notched carina at the periphery.

== Distribution ==
This marine species occurs off the Lesser Antilles and the Bahamas at depths between 183 mm and 628 m.
