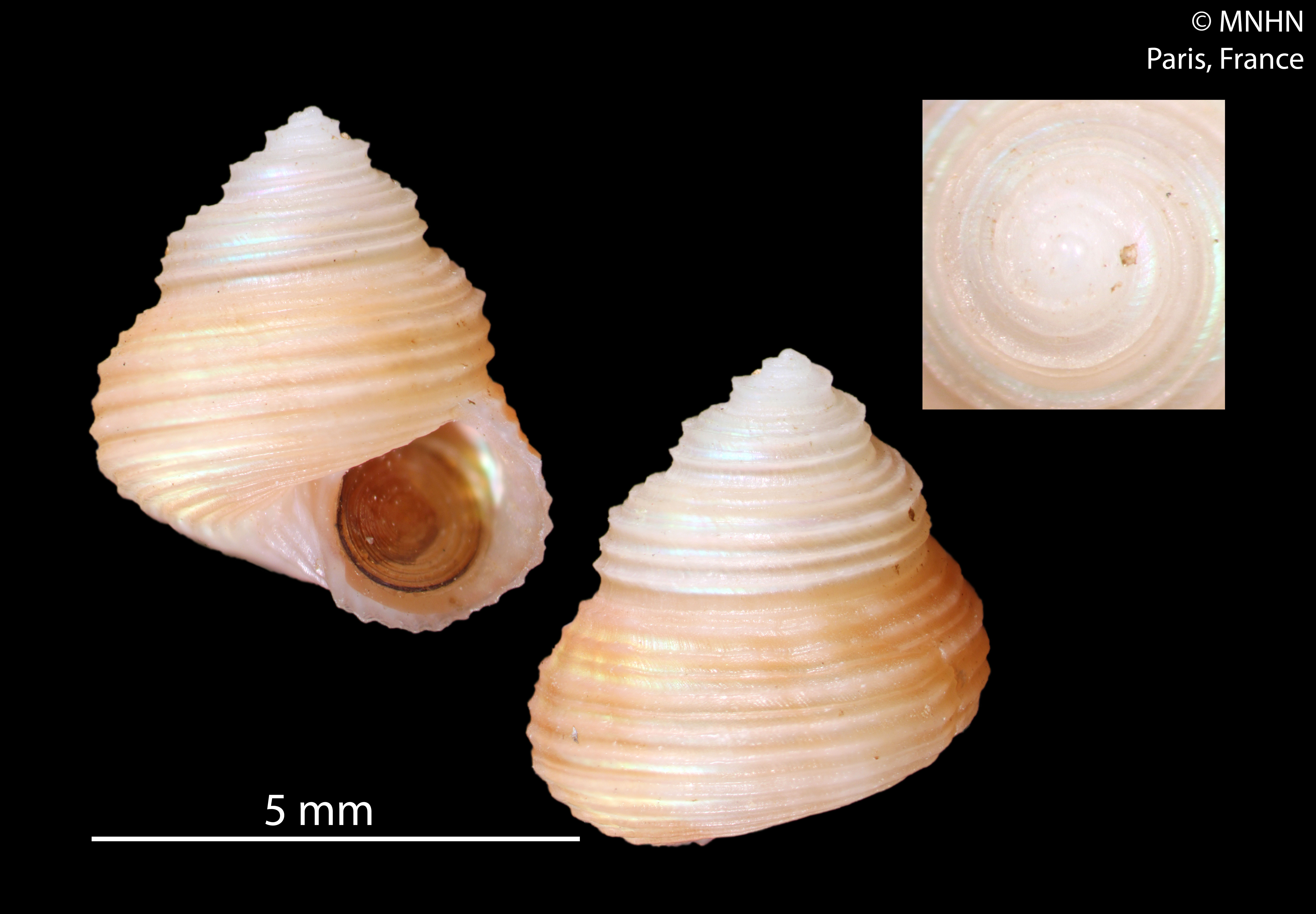
- Shell of Bruceina cognata (paratype at MNHN, Paris)

Scientific classification
- Kingdom: Animalia
- Phylum: Mollusca
- Class: Gastropoda
- Subclass: Vetigastropoda
- Order: Trochida
- Family: Calliostomatidae
- Genus: Bruceina
- Species: B. cognata

Binomial name
- Bruceina cognata (Marshall, 1988)

Synonyms
- Herbertina cognata B. A. Marshall, 1988

= Bruceina cognata =

Species of gastropod

Bruceina cognata is a species of sea snail, a marine gastropod mollusk in the family Calliostomatidae.

== Distribution ==
This marine species occurs off South Africa at depths between 85 m and 140 m.
