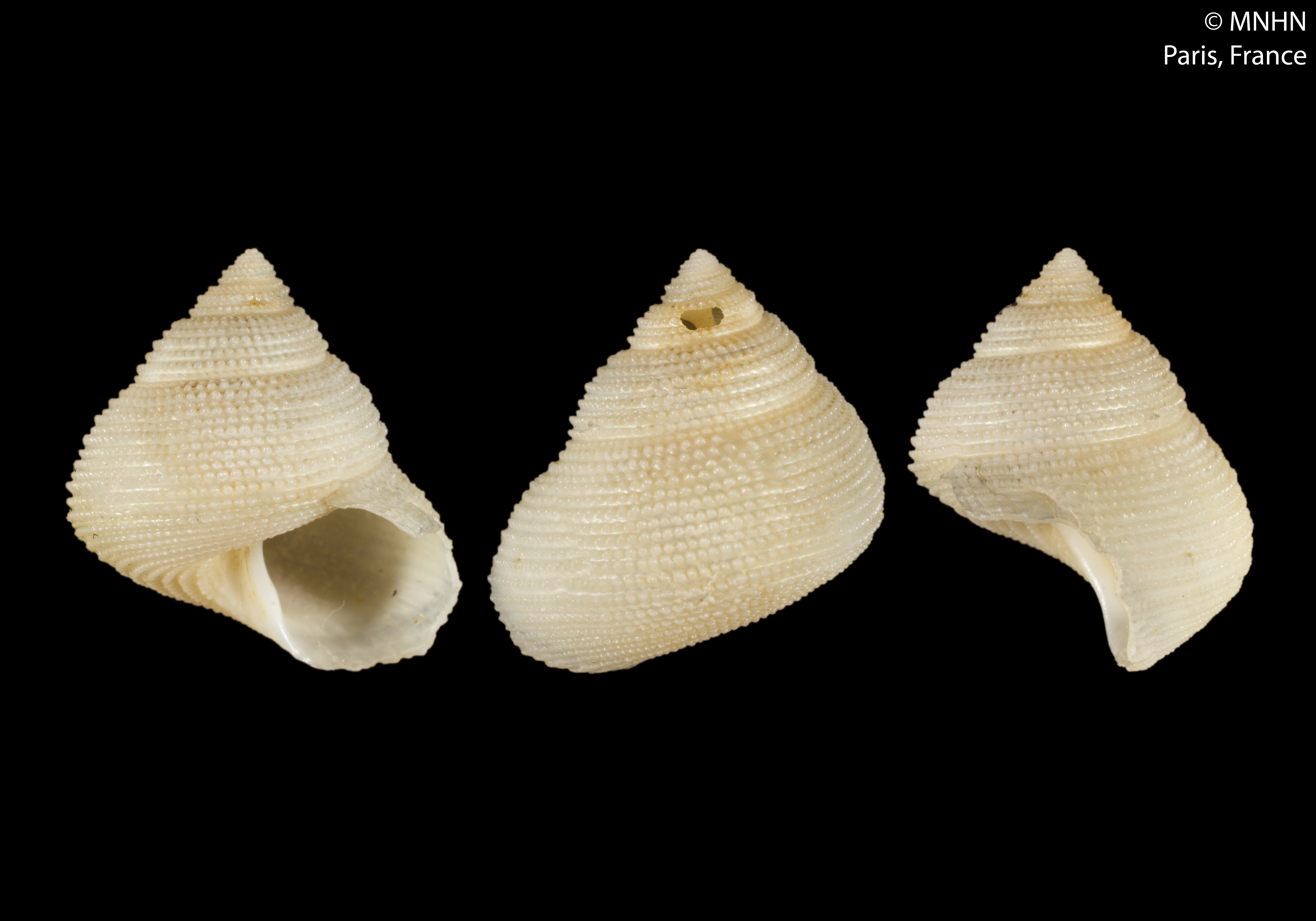
- Shell of Fautrix aquilonia (holotype at MNHN, Paris)

Scientific classification
- Kingdom: Animalia
- Phylum: Mollusca
- Class: Gastropoda
- Subclass: Vetigastropoda
- Order: Trochida
- Family: Calliostomatidae
- Genus: Fautrix
- Species: F. aquilonia

Binomial name
- Fautrix aquilonia Marshall, 1995

= Fautrix aquilonia =

Species of gastropod

Fautrix aquilonia is a species of sea snail, a marine gastropod mollusc in the family Calliostomatidae.

== Description ==
The length of the shell attains 12.6 mm.

== Distribution ==
This marine species occurs off New Caledonia, Norfolk Island and New Zealand at depths between 206 m and 535 m.
