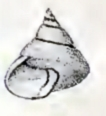

Scientific classification
- Kingdom: Animalia
- Phylum: Mollusca
- Class: Gastropoda
- Subclass: Vetigastropoda
- Order: Trochida
- Superfamily: Trochoidea
- Family: Calliostomatidae
- Genus: Sinutor
- Species: S. incertus

Binomial name
- Sinutor incertus (Reeve, 1863)

Synonyms
- Astele incertum [sic]; Calliostoma incertum (Reeve, 1863); Zizyphinus incertus Reeve, 1863

= Sinutor incertus =

Species of gastropod

Sinutor incertus is a species of sea snail, a marine gastropod mollusk, in the family Calliostomatidae within the superfamily Trochoidea, the top snails, turban snails and their allies.

== Description ==
The height of the shell attains 12 mm.

== Distribution and habitat ==
This marine species occurs off both eastern and western Australia, and Tasmania, at depths of 270 m.
