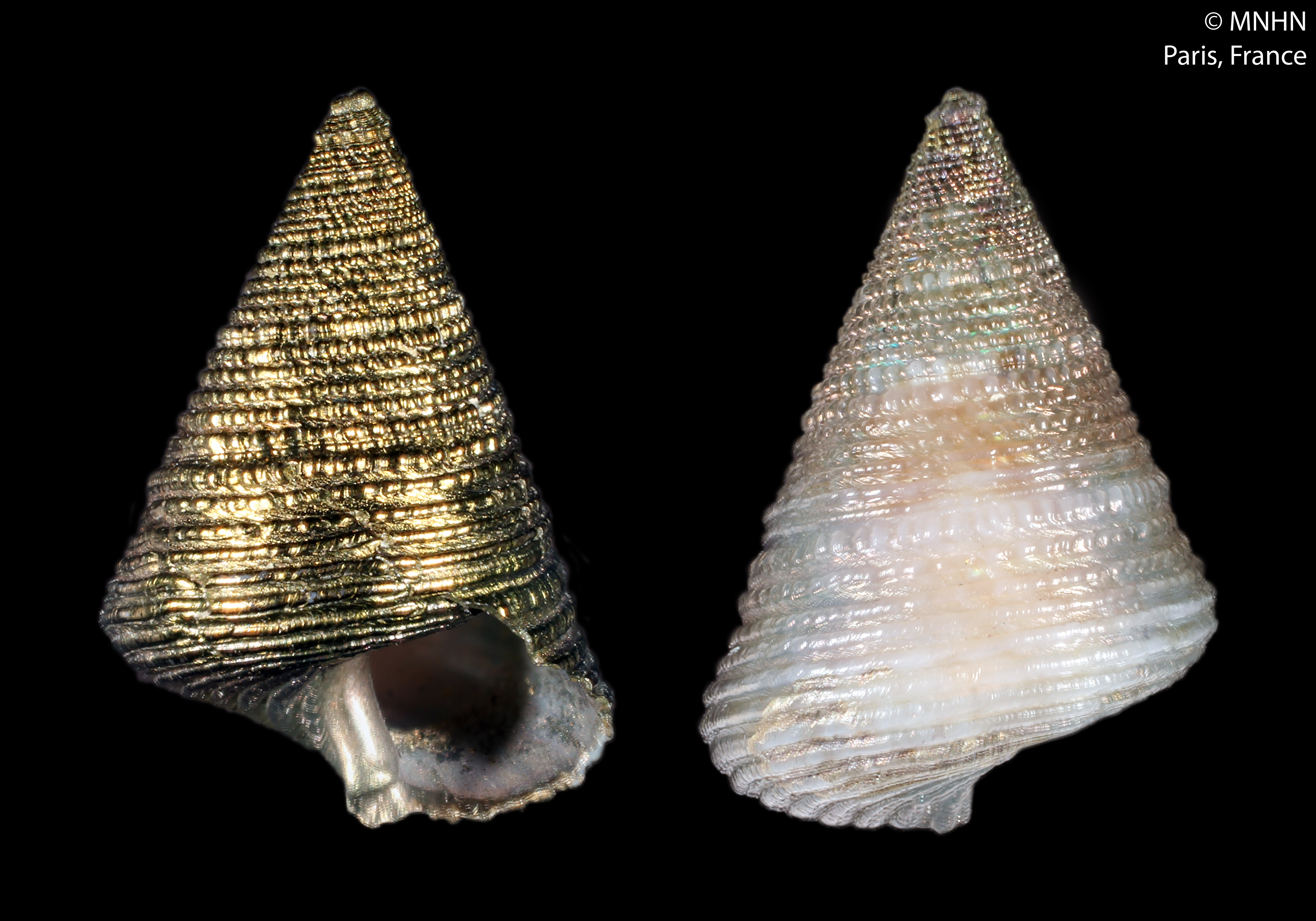
- Shell of Thysanodonta festiva (holotype at MNHN, Paris)

Scientific classification
- Kingdom: Animalia
- Phylum: Mollusca
- Class: Gastropoda
- Subclass: Vetigastropoda
- Order: Trochida
- Superfamily: Trochoidea
- Family: Calliostomatidae
- Genus: Thysanodonta
- Species: T. festiva

Binomial name
- Thysanodonta festiva Marshall, 1995

= Thysanodonta festiva =

Species of gastropod

Thysanodonta festiva is a species of sea snail, a marine gastropod mollusc in the family Calliostomatidae.

== Description ==
The size of the shell varies between 6 mm and 9 mm.

== Distribution ==
This marine species occurs off Norfolk Island at a depth of 230 m.
