= Bruceina chenoderma =

Scientific classification
- Kingdom: Animalia
- Phylum: Mollusca
- Class: Gastropoda
- Subclass: Vetigastropoda
- Order: Trochida
- Superfamily: Trochoidea
- Family: Calliostomatidae
- Genus: Bruceina
- Species: B. chenoderma

Binomial name
- Bruceina chenoderma (Barnard, 1963)

Synonyms
- Bruceina hayesi (Herbert, 1995); Calliotropis chenoderma Barnard, 1963; Herbertina hayesi Herbert, 1995

Species of gastropod

Bruceina chenoderma is a species of sea snail, a marine gastropod mollusk, in the family Calliostomatidae within the superfamily Trochoidea, the top snails, turban snails and their allies.

== Distribution ==
This marine species occurs off South Africa.
