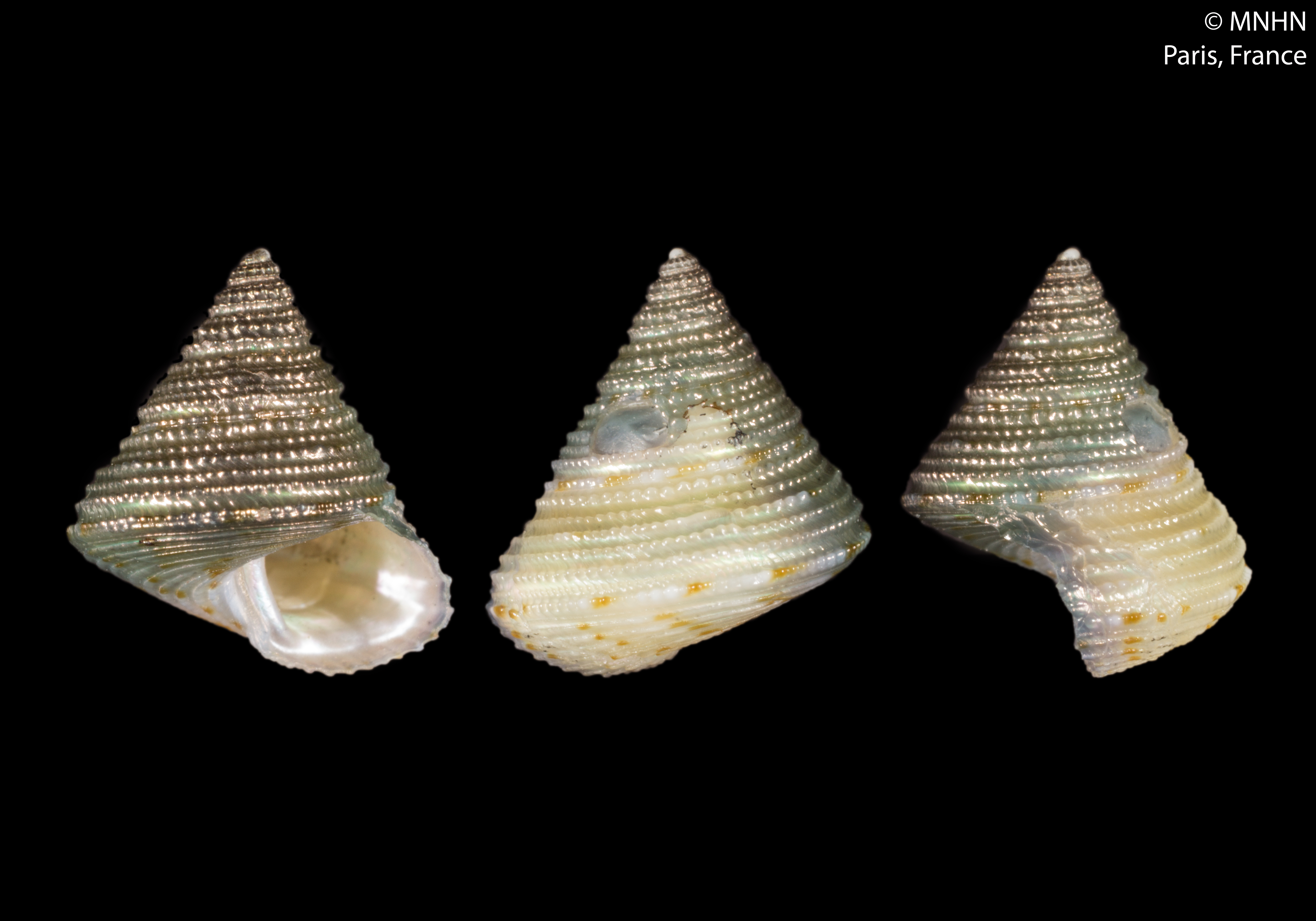
- Shell of Thysanodonta chesterfieldensis (holotype at MNHN. Paris)

Scientific classification
- Kingdom: Animalia
- Phylum: Mollusca
- Class: Gastropoda
- Subclass: Vetigastropoda
- Order: Trochida
- Family: Calliostomatidae
- Genus: Thysanodonta
- Species: T. chesterfieldensis

Binomial name
- Thysanodonta chesterfieldensis Marshall, 1995

= Thysanodonta chesterfieldensis =

Species of gastropod

Thysanodonta chesterfieldensis is a species of sea snail, a marine gastropod mollusc in the family Calliostomatidae.

== Description ==
The species' shell typically has around 5 whorls. The length of the shell attains 3.6 mm. Its body symmetry is dextrally coiled. The color of the shell starts as a pale brown on the upper half of the shell near the apex and gradually turns white towards the bottom. Its protoconch is made up of a densely packed hexagonal structure.

== Distribution ==
This marine species occurs off the Chesterfield Islands, New Caledonia, at depths between 305 m and 410 m.
