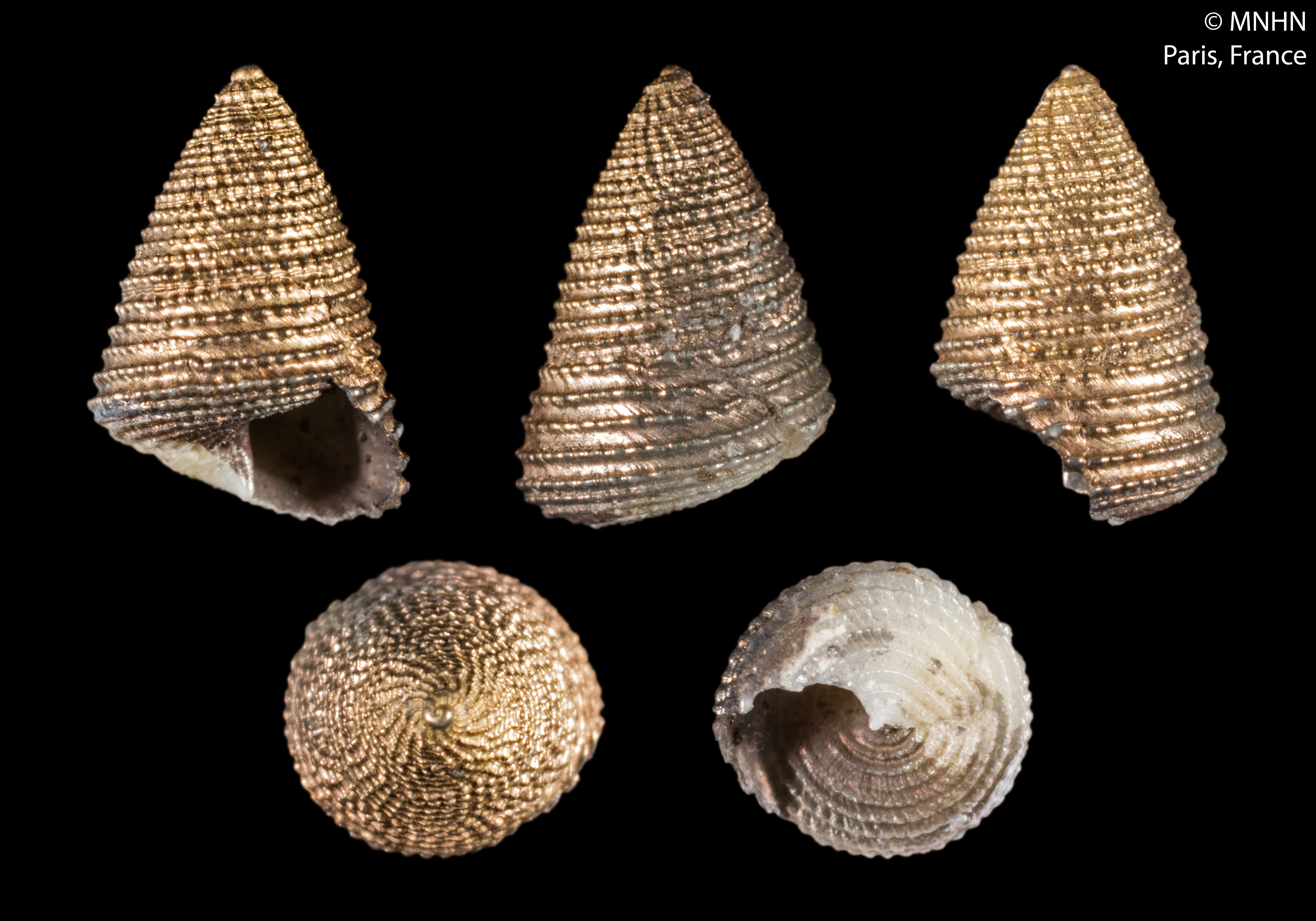
- Shell of Thysanodonta pileum (holotype at MNHN, Paris)

Scientific classification
- Kingdom: Animalia
- Phylum: Mollusca
- Class: Gastropoda
- Subclass: Vetigastropoda
- Order: Trochida
- Family: Calliostomatidae
- Genus: Thysanodonta
- Species: T. pileum

Binomial name
- Thysanodonta pileum Vilvens & Maestrati, 2006

= Thysanodonta pileum =

Species of gastropod

Thysanodonta pileum is a species of sea snail, a marine gastropod mollusc in the family Calliostomatidae.

== Description ==
The shell typically has a trochoid shape, with the aperture curving outwards. It has a notable rigid exterior and yellowish gold colouring. The length of the shell attains 5 mm.

== Distribution ==
This marine species occurs off New Caledonia on the Norfolk Ridge.
