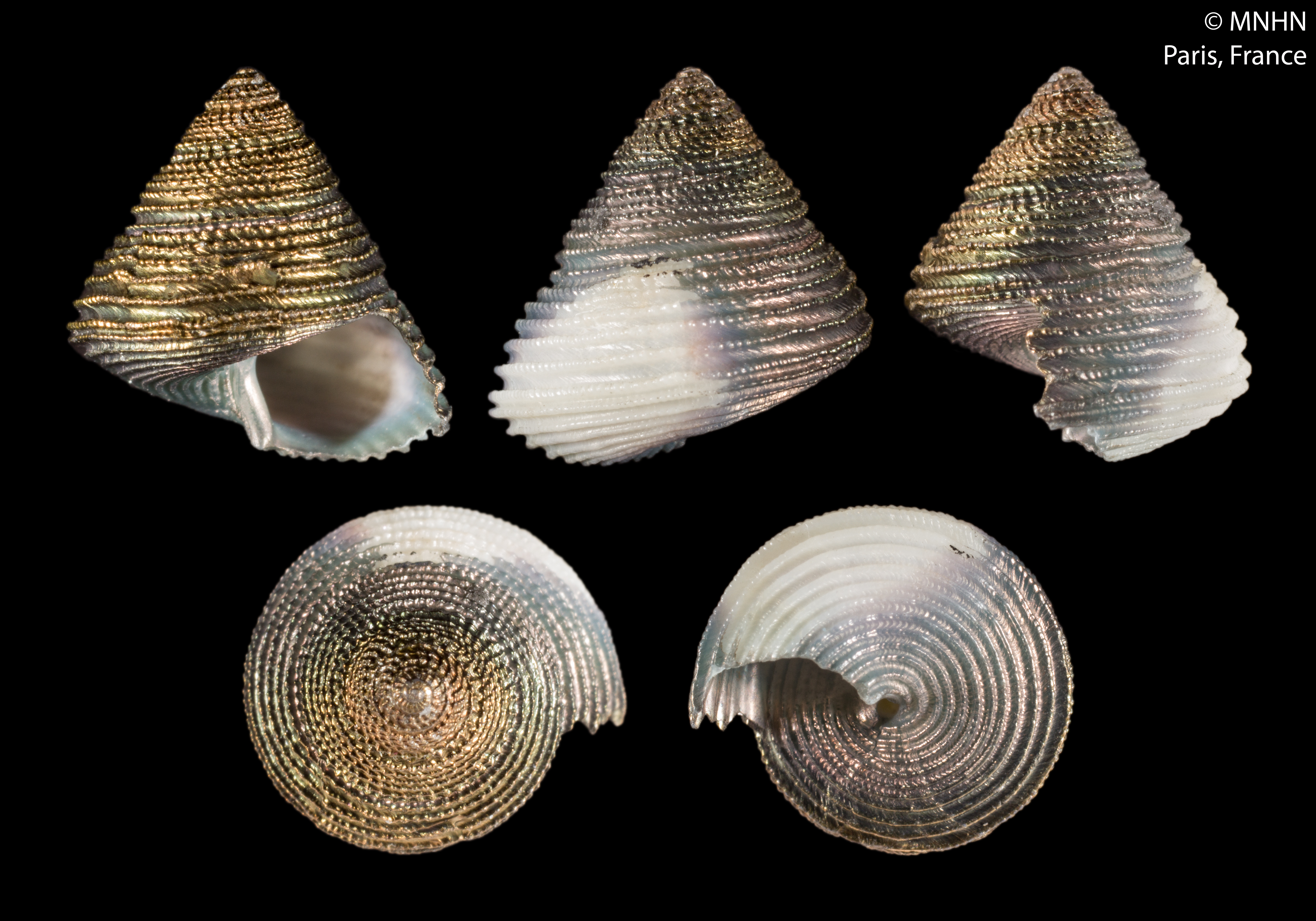
- Shell of Thysanodonta opima (holotype at MNHN, Paris)

Scientific classification
- Kingdom: Animalia
- Phylum: Mollusca
- Class: Gastropoda
- Subclass: Vetigastropoda
- Order: Trochida
- Family: Calliostomatidae
- Genus: Thysanodonta
- Species: T. opima

Binomial name
- Thysanodonta opima Marshall, 1995

= Thysanodonta opima =

Species of gastropod

Thysanodonta opima is a species of sea snail, a marine gastropod mollusc in the family Calliostomatidae.

== Description ==
The length of the shell attains 9.1 mm.

== Distribution ==
This marine species occurs off New Caledonia at depths between 775 m and 965 m.
