= Thysanodonta aucklandica =

Scientific classification
- Kingdom: Animalia
- Phylum: Mollusca
- Class: Gastropoda
- Subclass: Vetigastropoda
- Order: Trochida
- Family: Calliostomatidae
- Genus: Thysanodonta
- Species: T. aucklandica

Binomial name
- Thysanodonta aucklandica Marshall, 1988

Species of gastropod

Thysanodonta aucklandica is a species of sea snail, a marine gastropod mollusc in the family Calliostomatidae.

== Distribution ==
This marine species occurs off New Zealand at depths between 476 m and 549 m.
