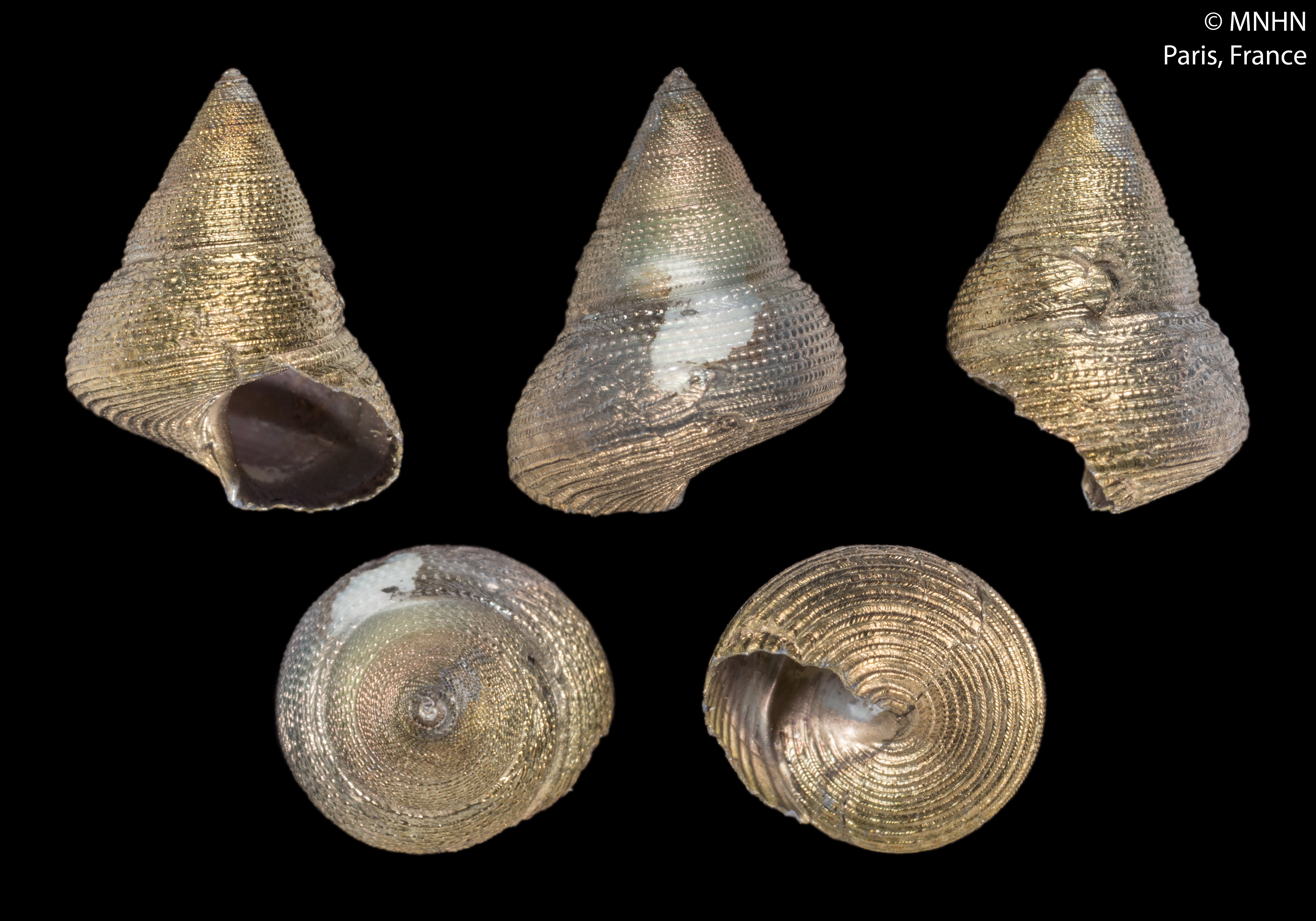
- Shell of Thysanodonta eucosmia (holotype at MNHN, Paris)

Scientific classification
- Kingdom: Animalia
- Phylum: Mollusca
- Class: Gastropoda
- Subclass: Vetigastropoda
- Order: Trochida
- Family: Calliostomatidae
- Genus: Thysanodonta
- Species: T. eucosmia

Binomial name
- Thysanodonta eucosmia Marshall, 1995

= Thysanodonta eucosmia =

Species of gastropod

Thysanodonta eucosmia is a species of sea snail, a marine gastropod mollusc in the family Calliostomatidae.

== Description ==
The height of the shell attains 4 mm. It has a spiral shell of varying colors including bronze, light pink, white and red.

== Distribution ==
This marine species occurs off Norfolk Island at depths between 410 m and 775 m.
