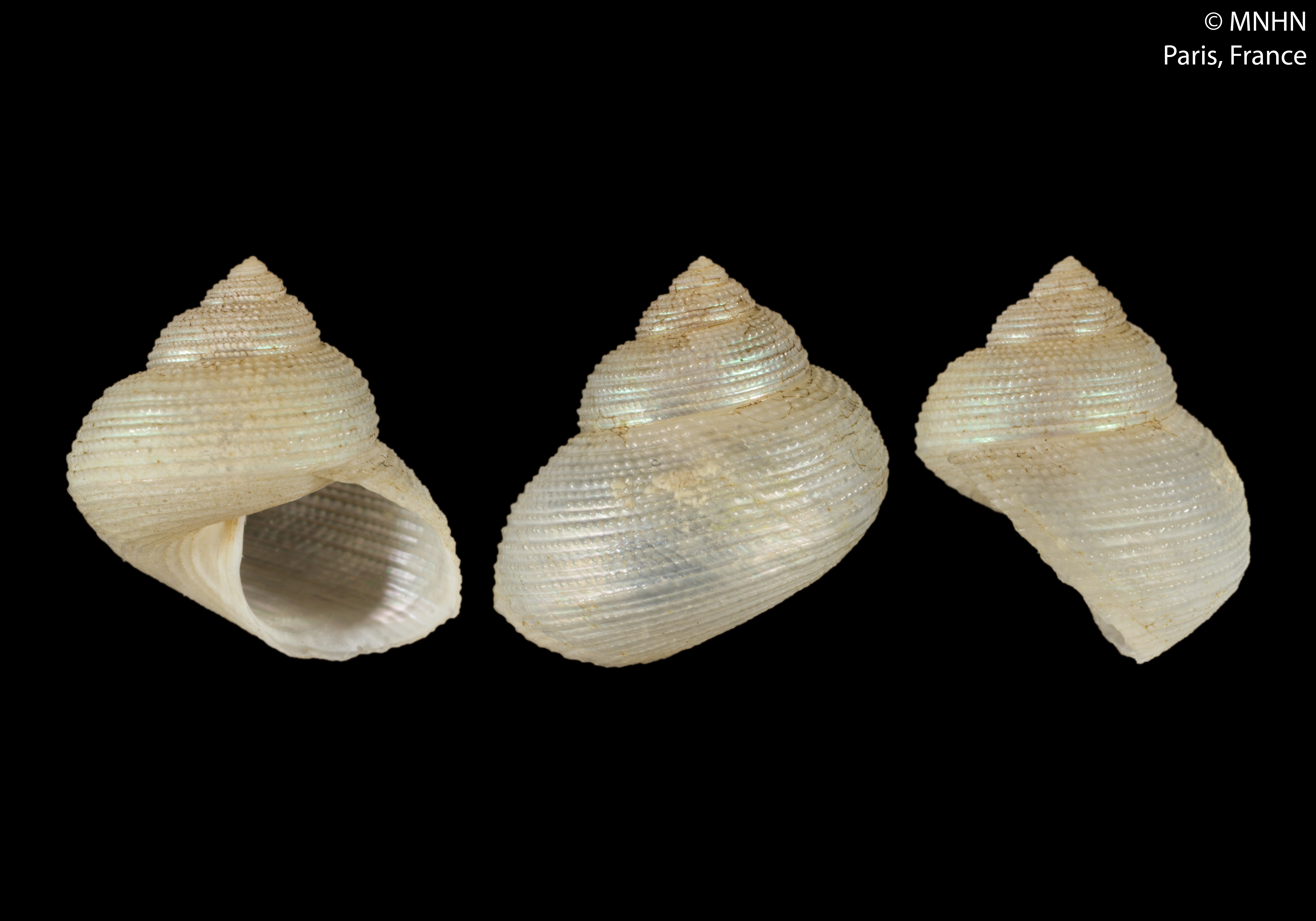
- Shell of Fautrix candida (holotype at MNHN, Paris)

Scientific classification
- Kingdom: Animalia
- Phylum: Mollusca
- Class: Gastropoda
- Subclass: Vetigastropoda
- Order: Trochida
- Family: Calliostomatidae
- Genus: Fautrix
- Species: F. candida

Binomial name
- Fautrix candida Marshall, 1995

= Fautrix candida =

Species of gastropod

Fautrix candida is a species of sea snail, a marine gastropod mollusc in the family Calliostomatidae. Fautrix candida was identified by Dr. Bruce Marshall in 2007.

== Description ==
Fautrix candida grows to a maximum height of 14 millimetres and a maximum width of 13 millimetres.

== Distribution ==
Fautrix candida is endemic to the areas of Wanganella Bank on the south side of Norfolk Ridge at a depth of up to 356 metres, as well as around Three Kings Islands at depths between 200 and 805 metres and off the coast of southern New Caledonia at depths between 470 and 550 metres.
