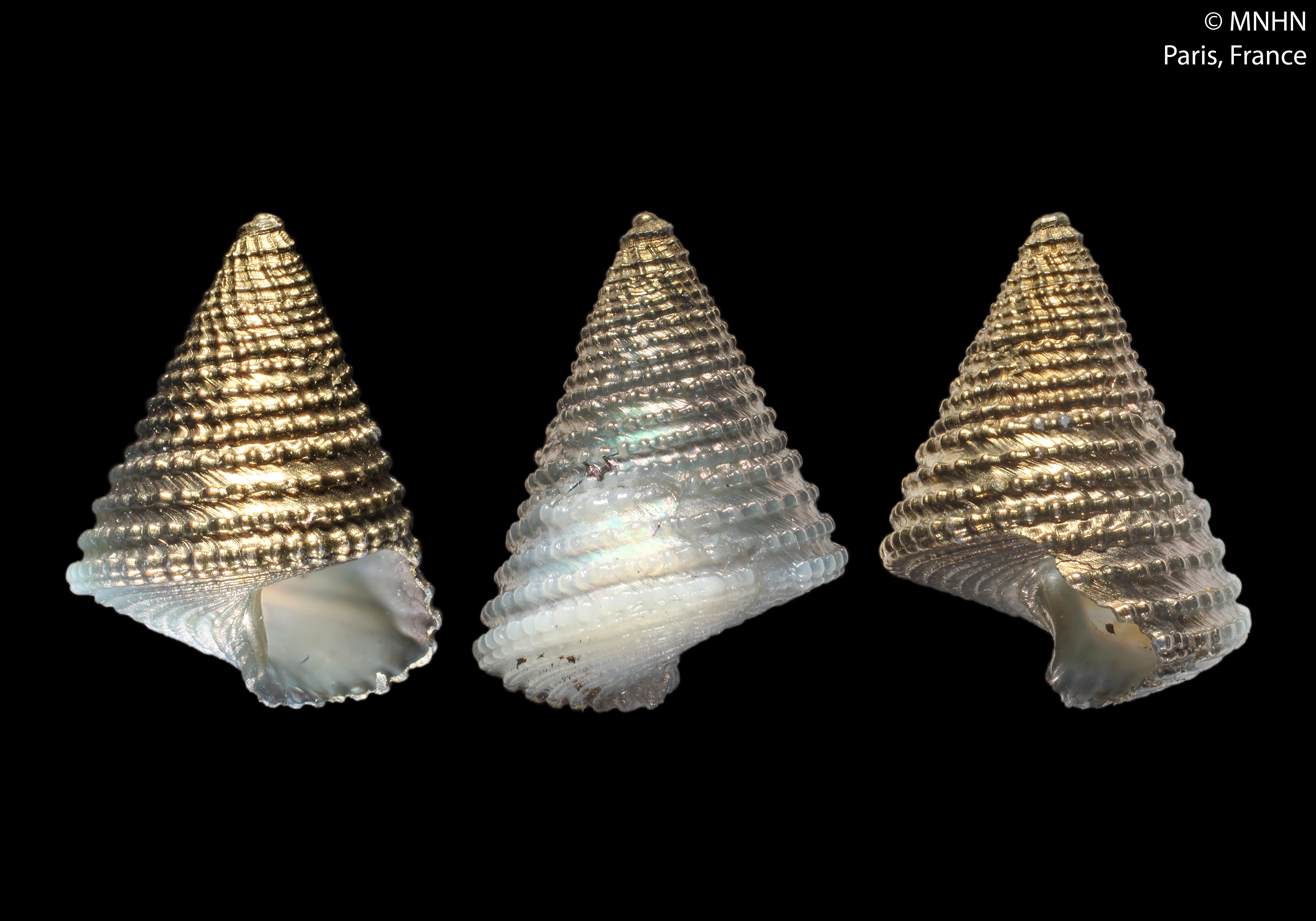
- Shell of Thysanodonta boucheti (holotype at MNHN, Paris)

Scientific classification
- Kingdom: Animalia
- Phylum: Mollusca
- Class: Gastropoda
- Subclass: Vetigastropoda
- Order: Trochida
- Family: Calliostomatidae
- Genus: Thysanodonta
- Species: T. boucheti

Binomial name
- Thysanodonta boucheti Marshall, 1988

= Thysanodonta boucheti =

Species of gastropod

Thysanodonta boucheti is a species of sea snail, a marine gastropod mollusc in the family Calliostomatidae.

== Description ==
The height of the shell attains 4 mm.

== Distribution ==
This marine species occurs off New Caledonia at depths between 300 m and 350 m.
