= Xeniostoma inexpectans =

Scientific classification
- Kingdom: Animalia
- Phylum: Mollusca
- Class: Gastropoda
- Subclass: Vetigastropoda
- Order: Trochida
- Superfamily: Trochoidea
- Family: Calliostomatidae
- Genus: Xeniostoma
- Species: X. inexpectans

Binomial name
- Xeniostoma inexpectans McLean, 2012

Species of gastropod

Xeniostoma inexpectans is a species of sea snail, a marine gastropod mollusc in the family Calliostomatidae.

== Description ==
The height of the thin, silvery white shell attains 8.7 mm.

== Distribution ==
This marine species occurs off the Aleutian Islands, Alaska, at depths between 200 m and 400 m.
