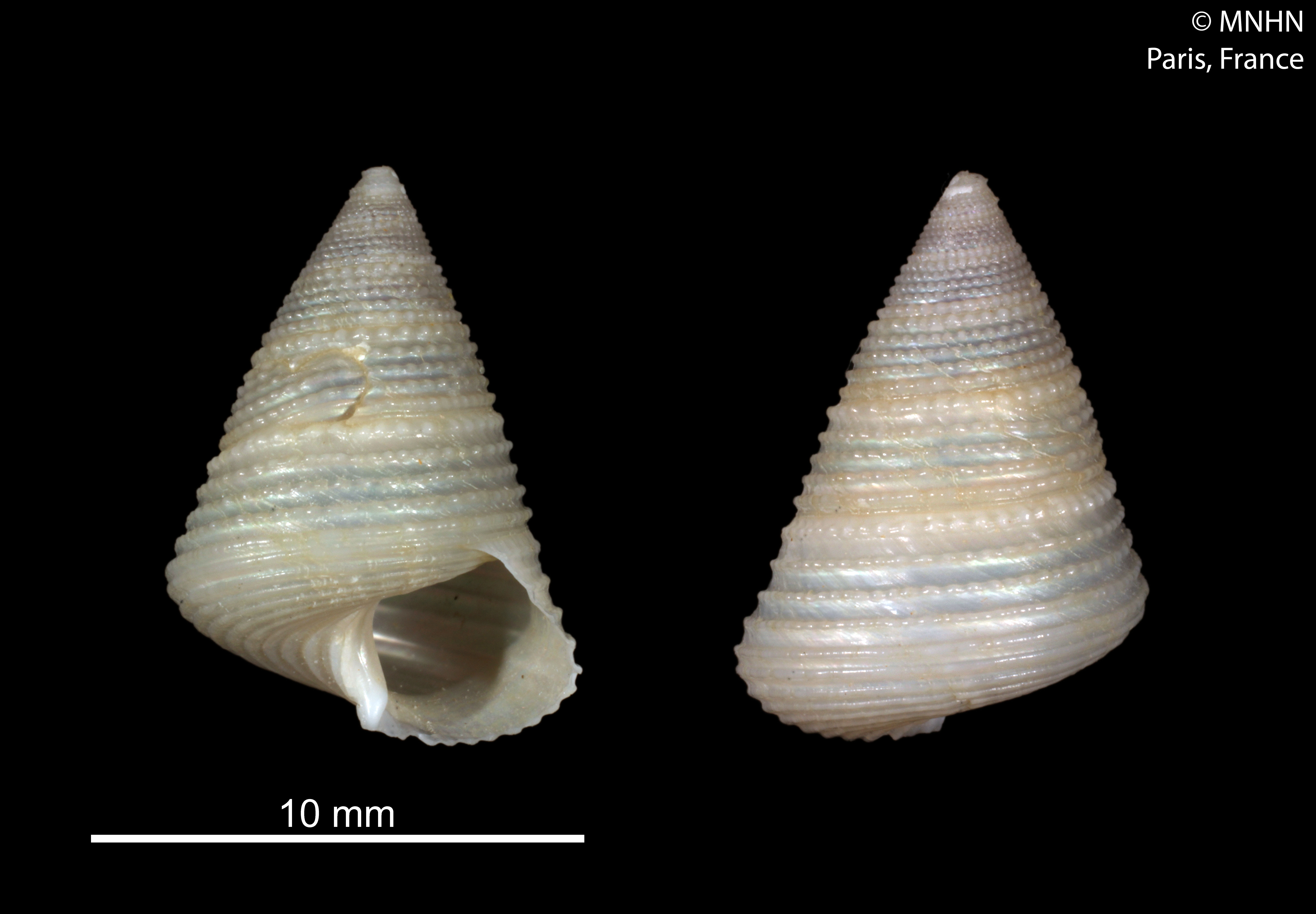
- Shell of Thysanodonta cassis (specimen at MNHN, Paris)

Scientific classification
- Kingdom: Animalia
- Phylum: Mollusca
- Class: Gastropoda
- Subclass: Vetigastropoda
- Order: Trochida
- Family: Calliostomatidae
- Genus: Thysanodonta
- Species: T. cassis

Binomial name
- Thysanodonta cassis Vilvens & Maestrati, 2006

= Thysanodonta cassis =

Species of gastropod

Thysanodonta cassis is a species of sea snail, a marine gastropod mollusc in the family Calliostomatidae.

== Distribution ==
This marine species occurs off New Caledonia.
