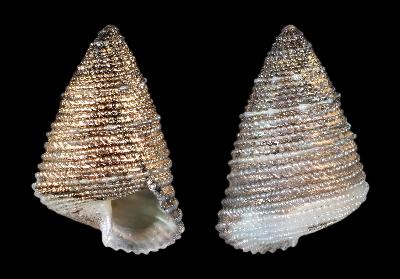
- Shell of Thysanodonta diadema (holotype in MNHN, Paris)

Scientific classification
- Kingdom: Animalia
- Phylum: Mollusca
- Class: Gastropoda
- Subclass: Vetigastropoda
- Order: Trochida
- Family: Calliostomatidae
- Genus: Thysanodonta
- Species: T. diadema

Binomial name
- Thysanodonta diadema Vilvens & Maestrati, 2006

= Thysanodonta diadema =

Species of gastropod

Thysanodonta diadema is a species of sea snail, a marine gastropod mollusc in the family Calliostomatidae. It was originally described by B.A. Marshall in 1988.

== Description ==
The length of the shell attains 5 mm.

== Distribution ==
The marine species occurs off New Caledonia.
