= Thysanodonta wairua =

Scientific classification
- Kingdom: Animalia
- Phylum: Mollusca
- Class: Gastropoda
- Subclass: Vetigastropoda
- Order: Trochida
- Family: Calliostomatidae
- Genus: Thysanodonta
- Species: T. wairua

Binomial name
- Thysanodonta wairua Marshall, 1988

Species of gastropod

Thysanodonta wairua is a species of sea snail, a marine gastropod mollusc in the family Calliostomatidae.

== Distribution ==
This marine species occurs off New Zealand at depths between 98 m and 805 m.
