= Calliostoma iridium =

Scientific classification
- Kingdom: Animalia
- Phylum: Mollusca
- Class: Gastropoda
- Subclass: Vetigastropoda
- Order: Trochida
- Family: Calliostomatidae
- Subfamily: Calliostomatinae
- Genus: Calliostoma
- Species: C. iridium

Binomial name
- Calliostoma iridium Dall, 1896

Species of gastropod

Calliostoma iridium, common name the Panama rainbow top shell, is a species of sea snail, a marine gastropod mollusk in the family Calliostomatidae.

== Description ==
The height of the shell attains 19 mm.

== Distribution ==
This marine species occurs in the Gulf of Panama and off Pacific Colombia at depths between 230 m and 280 m.
