= Bruceina eos =

Scientific classification
- Kingdom: Animalia
- Phylum: Mollusca
- Class: Gastropoda
- Subclass: Vetigastropoda
- Order: Trochida
- Family: Calliostomatidae
- Genus: Bruceina
- Species: B. eos

Binomial name
- Bruceina eos (Marshall, 1988)

Synonyms
- Herbertina cognata B. A. Marshall, 1988

Species of mollusc

Bruceina eos is a species of sea snail, a marine gastropod mollusk in the family Calliostomatidae.

== Distribution ==
This marine species occurs off South Africa at depths between 85 m and 240 m.
