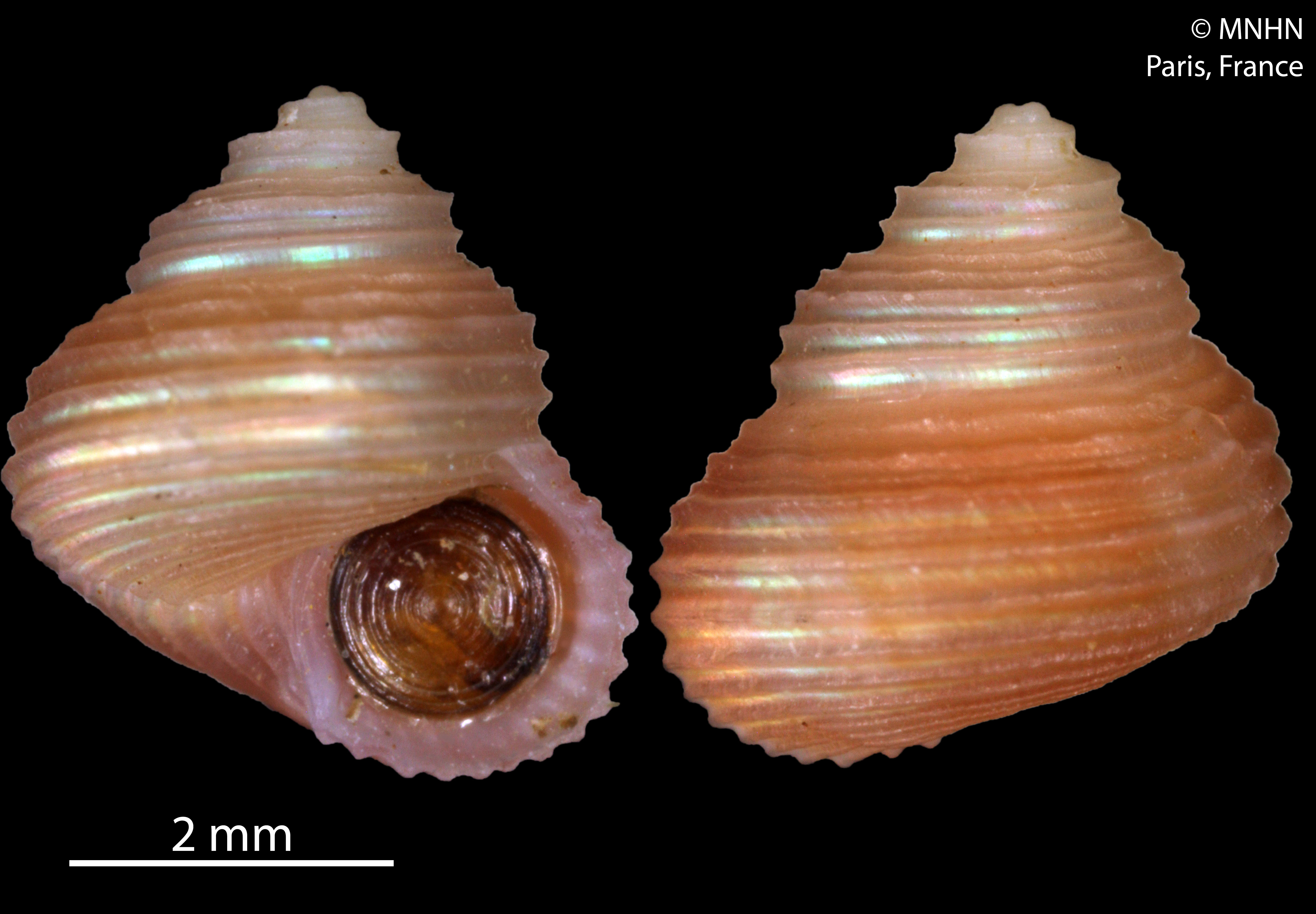
- Shell of Bruceina cognata

Scientific classification
- Kingdom: Animalia
- Phylum: Mollusca
- Class: Gastropoda
- Subclass: Vetigastropoda
- Order: Trochida
- Superfamily: Trochoidea
- Family: Calliostomatidae
- Genus: Bruceina; Özdikmen, 2013

Type species
- Herbertina eos B. A. Marshall, 1988

Synonyms
- Herbertina B. A. Marshall, 1988 (invalid: junior homonym of Herbertina Schaus, 1901 [Lepidoptera]; Bruceina is a replacement name)

= Bruceina =

Genus of gastropods

Bruceina is a genus of sea snails, marine gastropod mollusks in the family Calliostomatidae.

== Species ==
Species within the genus Bruceina include:

- Bruceina chenoderma (Barnard, 1963)
- Bruceina cognata Marshall, 1988
- Bruceina eos Marshall, 1988

Species brought into synonymy

- Bruceina hayesi Herbert, 1995: synonym of Bruceina chenoderma (Barnard, 1963)
