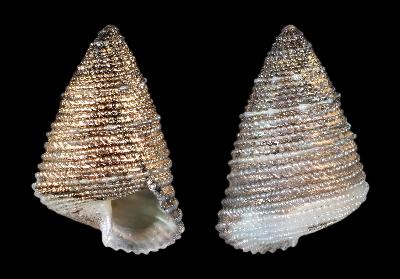
- Shell of Thysanodonta diadema

Scientific classification
- Kingdom: Animalia
- Phylum: Mollusca
- Class: Gastropoda
- Subclass: Vetigastropoda
- Order: Trochida
- Superfamily: Trochoidea
- Family: Calliostomatidae
- Genus: Thysanodonta; Marshall, 1988

Type species
- Thysanodonta aucklandica Marshall, B.A., 1988

= Thysanodonta =

Genus of gastropods

Thysanodonta is a genus of sea snails, marine gastropod molluscs in the family Calliostomatidae.

== Distribution ==
Species of this marine genus can be found off New Zealand and New Caledonia.

== Species ==
Species within the genus Thysanodonta include:

- Thysanodonta aucklandica Marshall, 1988
- Thysanodonta boucheti Marshall, 1988
- Thysanodonta cassis Vilvens & Maestrati, 2006
- Thysanodonta chesterfieldensis Marshall, 1995
- Thysanodonta diadema Vilvens & Maestrati, 2006
- Thysanodonta eucosmia Marshall, 1995
- Thysanodonta festiva Marshall, 1995
- Thysanodonta opima Marshall, 1995
- Thysanodonta pileum Vilvens & Maestrati, 2006
- Thysanodonta wairua Marshall, 1988
