= Xeniostoma =

Scientific classification
- Kingdom: Animalia
- Phylum: Mollusca
- Class: Gastropoda
- Subclass: Vetigastropoda
- Order: Trochida
- Superfamily: Trochoidea
- Family: Calliostomatidae
- Genus: Xeniostoma; McLean, 2012

Genus of gastropods

Xeniostoma is a genus of sea snails, marine gastropod mollusks in the family Calliostomatidae within the superfamily Trochoidea, the top snails, turban snails and their allies.

== Species ==
Species within the genus Xeniostoma include:

- Xeniostoma inexpectans McLean, 2012
