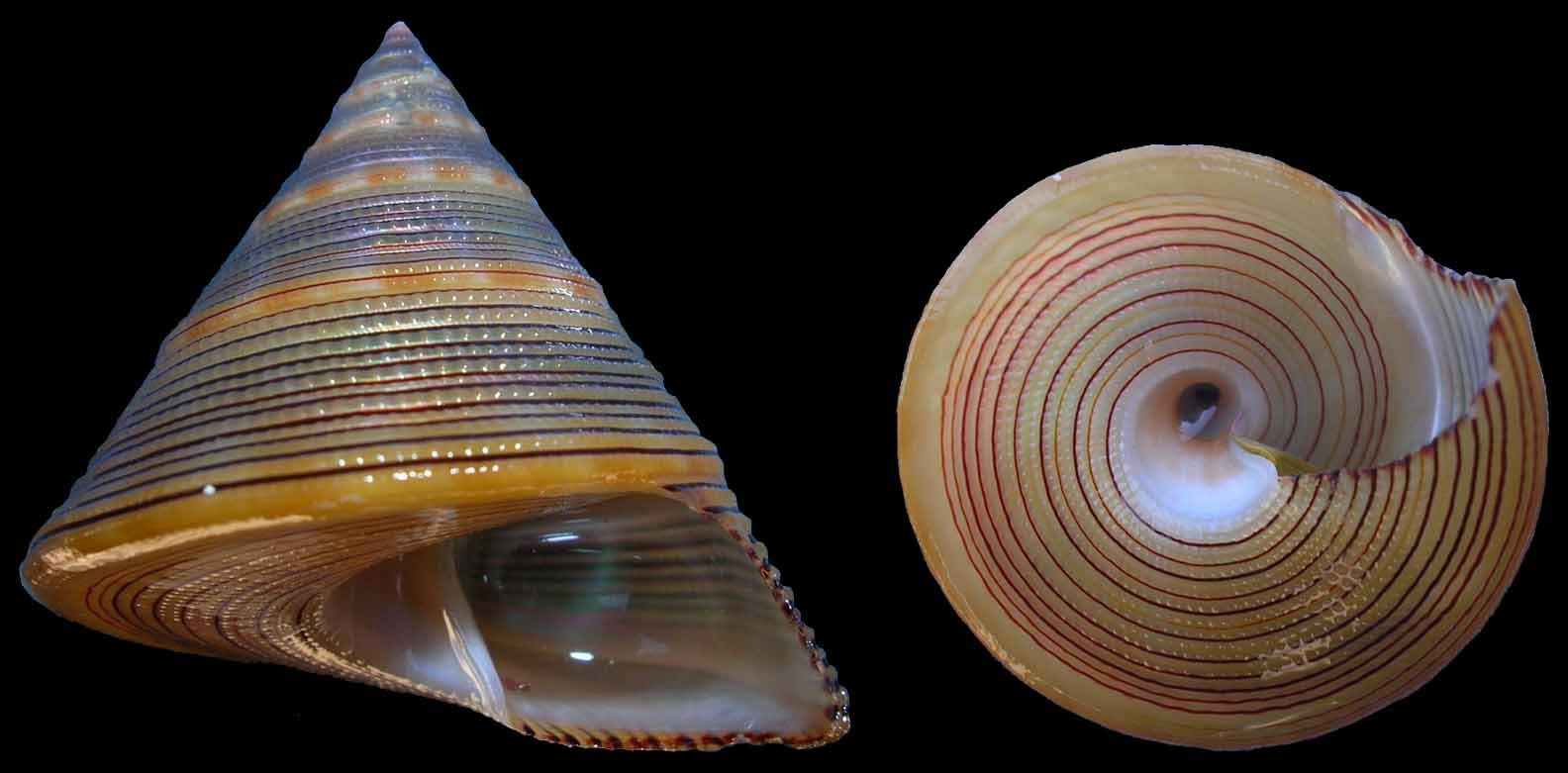
- Apertural and umbilical view of the shell of Calliostoma javanicum.

Conservation status
- Apparently Secure (NatureServe)

Scientific classification
- Kingdom: Animalia
- Phylum: Mollusca
- Class: Gastropoda
- Subclass: Vetigastropoda
- Order: Trochida
- Family: Calliostomatidae
- Genus: Calliostoma
- Species: C. javanicum

Binomial name
- Calliostoma javanicum (Lamarck, 1822)

= Calliostoma javanicum =

Species of gastropod

Calliostoma javanicum, common name the chocolate-lined top shell, is a species of sea snail, a marine gastropod mollusk in the family Calliostomatidae.

== Description ==
The height of the shell varies between 19 mm and 35 mm. The conical shell has straight outlines. The base of the shell is flat, with a deep, funnel-shaped umbilicus. The shell is rather solid. It is light yellowish, with numerous narrow, sharply defined dark-brown or blackish spiral lines. The outlines of the spire are straight. The sutures are not at all impressed. The minute apex is smooth. There are about nine, flat whorls, encircled by numerous equal, finely beaded lirae of which there are about 9 on penultimate whorl. The interstices are densely costulated by fine incremental striae. The body whorl is acutely angled at the periphery. It is flat below and nearly smooth toward the outer edge, and finely granose-striate on the inner half. The aperture is rhomboidal. The lip is thin. The columella is arcuate above, and strongly toothed below. The umbilicus is wide and bounded by a beaded cord.

== Distribution ==
This species occurs in the Caribbean Sea, the Gulf of Mexico and the Lesser Antilles; in the Atlantic Ocean off Eastern Brazil.

== Description ==
The maximum recorded shell length is 35 mm.

== Habitat ==
Minimum recorded depth is 1 m. Maximum recorded depth is 97 m.
