= Neocalliostoma =

Scientific classification
- Kingdom: Animalia
- Phylum: Mollusca
- Class: Gastropoda
- Subclass: Vetigastropoda
- Order: Trochida
- Superfamily: Trochoidea
- Family: Calliostomatidae
- Genus: Neocalliostoma; Castellanos & Fernandez, 1976

Genus of gastropods

Neocalliostoma is a genus of sea snails, marine gastropod mollusks in the family Calliostomatidae within the superfamily Trochoidea, the top snails, turban snails and their allies.

== Species ==
- Neocalliostoma militare (Ihering, 1907) is a synonym of Calliostoma militare Ihering, 1907
