= Sinutor =

Scientific classification
- Kingdom: Animalia
- Phylum: Mollusca
- Class: Gastropoda
- Subclass: Vetigastropoda
- Order: Trochida
- Superfamily: Trochoidea
- Family: Calliostomatidae
- Genus: Sinutor; Cotton & Godfrey, 1935

Genus of gastropods

Sinutor is a genus of sea snails, marine gastropod mollusks in the family Calliostomatidae within the superfamily Trochoidea, the top snails, turban snails and their allies.

== Notes ==
Additional information regarding this genus:

- Taxonomic Remark: Some authors use Sinutor Cotton & Godfrey, 1935 as a subgenus in Calliostoma Swainson, 1840

== Species ==
The following species were brought into synonymy:

- Sinutor incertus (Reeve, 1863) accepted as Calliostoma incertum (Reeve, 1863)
