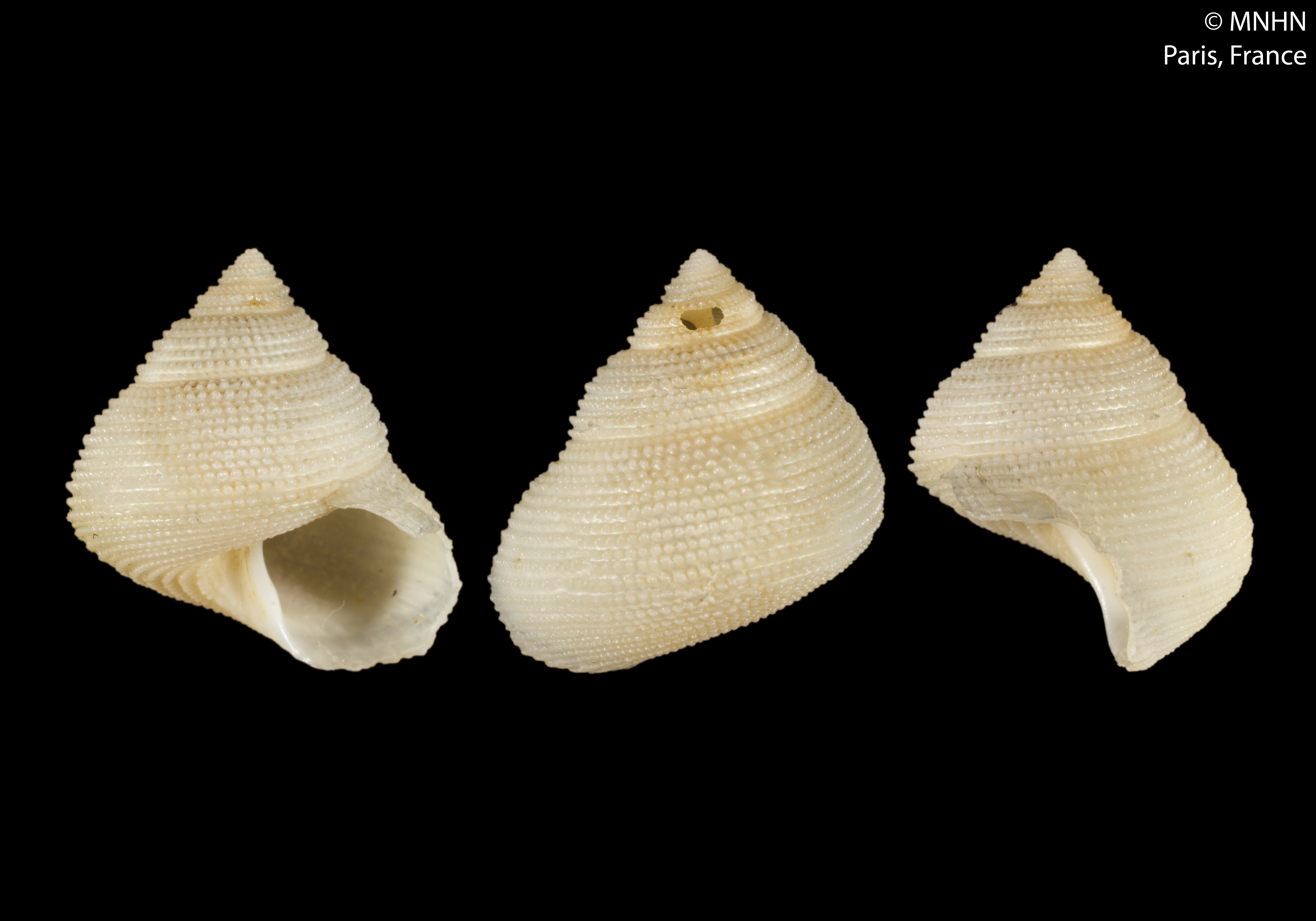
- Shell of Fautrix aquilonia (holotype at MNHN, Paris)

Scientific classification
- Kingdom: Animalia
- Phylum: Mollusca
- Class: Gastropoda
- Subclass: Vetigastropoda
- Order: Trochida
- Superfamily: Trochoidea
- Family: Calliostomatidae
- Genus: Fautrix; Marshall, 1995

Type species
- Fautrix candida Marshall, B.A., 1995

= Fautrix =

Genus of gastropods

Fautrix is a genus of sea snails, marine gastropod mollusks in the family Calliostomatidae.

== Species ==
Species within the genus Fautrix include:

- Fautrix aquilonia Marshall, 1995
- Fautrix candida Marshall, 1995
