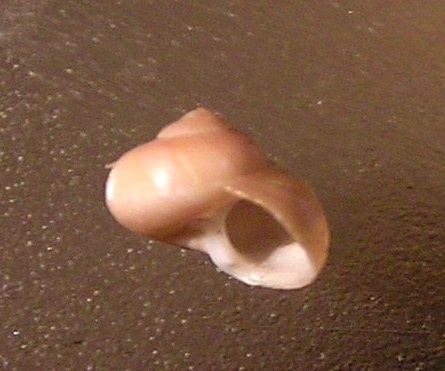
- Photinula blakei, a sea snail from the family Calliostomatidae, in Argentina

Scientific classification
- Kingdom: Animalia
- Phylum: Mollusca
- Class: Gastropoda
- Subclass: Vetigastropoda
- Order: Trochida
- Family: Calliostomatidae
- Subfamily: Calliostomatinae; Thiele, 1924 (1847)

Genera
- See text

Synonyms
- Calliostomatini Thiele, 1924 (1847)

= Calliostomatinae =

Subfamily of gastropods

Calliostomatinae is a subfamily of gastropods, belonging to the family Calliostomatidae.

== Description ==
They are somewhat large sea snails — marine gastropod mollusks, with gills and a thin, circular, corneous, and many-whorled operculum. Their shell is conical with angular periphery. The spiral sculpture consists of raised cords, in many cases strongly beaded. The protoconch has a raised hexagonal pattern. The columella is simple above, not folded, and either simply concave below or slightly truncate and toothed. The radula has the rhachidian and 4 to 5 lateral teeth with irregularly oval body, and rather long, pointed cusps, their outer edges serrate. The inner marginal teeth are enlarged, and the pseudo-proboscis of the animal is well developed.

== Genera ==
- Akoya Habe, 1961
- Alertalex Dell, 1956
- Astele Swainson, 1855
- Astelena Iredale, 1924
- Bathyfautor Marshall, 1995
- Calliostoma Swainson, 1840
- Carinator Ikebe, 1942
- Dactylastele Marshall, 1995
- Dymares Schwengel, 1942
- Eucasta Dall, 1889
- Falsimargarita Powell, 1951
- Fautrix Marshall, 1995
- Fluxina Dall, 1881
- Laetifautor Iredale, 1929
- Neocalliostoma Castellanos & Fernandez, 1976
- Otukaia Ikebe, 1942
- Photinastoma Powell, 1951
- Photinula H. Adams & A. Adams, 1854
- Selastele B. A. Marshall, 1995
- Sinutor Cotton & Godfrey, 1935
- Tropidotrochus Parodiz, 1977
- Venustas Allan, 1926
- Ziziphinus Gray, 1842

Genera brought into synonymy

- Ampullotrochus Monterosato, 1890: synonym of Calliostoma (Ampullotrochus) Monterosato, 1890 represented as Calliostoma Swainson, 1840
- Benthastelena Iredale, 1936: synonym of Calliostoma Swainson, 1840
- Calliotropis Oliver, 1926: synonym of Calliostoma (Maurea) Oliver, 1926 represented as Calliostoma Swainson, 1840
- Callistele Cotton & Godfrey, 1935: synonym of Astele Swainson, 1855
- Callistoma Herrmannsen, 1846: synonym of Calliostoma Swainson, 1840
- Callistomus Herrmannsen, 1846: synonym of Calliostoma Swainson, 1840
- Calotropis Thiele, 1929: synonym of Calliostoma (Maurea) Oliver, 1926 represented as Calliostoma Swainson, 1840
- Conulus Nardo, 1841: synonym of Calliostoma Swainson, 1840
- Coralastele Iredale, 1930: synonym of Astele Swainson, 1855
- Elmerlinia Clench & Turner, 1960: synonym of Calliostoma Swainson, 1840
- Eutrochus A. Adams, 1864: synonym of Astele Swainson, 1855
- Fautor Iredale, 1924: synonym of Calliostoma (Fautor) Iredale, 1924 represented as Calliostoma Swainson, 1840
- Jacinthinus Monterosato, 1889: synonym of Calliostoma Swainson, 1840
- Kingotrochus Ihering, 1902: synonym of Photinula H. Adams & A. Adams, 1854
- Kombologion Clench & Turner, 1960: synonym of Calliostoma Swainson, 1840
- Leiotrochus Conrad, 1862: synonym of Calliostoma Swainson, 1840
- Maurea Oliver, 1926: synonym of Calliostoma (Maurea) Oliver, 1926 represented as Calliostoma Swainson, 1840
- Mauriella Oliver, 1926: synonym of Calliostoma (Maurea) Oliver, 1926 represented as Calliostoma Swainson, 1840
- Mucrinops Finlay, 1926: synonym of Calliostoma (Maurea) Oliver, 1926 represented as Calliostoma Swainson, 1840
- Omphalotukaia Yoshida, 1948: synonym of 'alliostoma Swainson, 1840
- Photina H. Adams & A. Adams, 1853: synonym of Photinula H. Adams & A. Adams, 1854
- Salsipotens Iredale, 1924: synonym of Astele Swainson, 1855
- Spicator Cotton & Godfrey, 1935: synonym of Laetifautor Iredale, 1929
- Tristichotrochus Ikebe, 1942: synonym of Calliostoma (Benthastelena) Iredale, 1936 represented as Calliostoma Swainson, 1840
- Venustas Finlay, 1927: synonym of Calliostoma (Maurea) Oliver, 1926 represented as Calliostoma Swainson, 1840
- Zizyphinus Gray, 1847: synonym of Ziziphinus Gray, 1842
