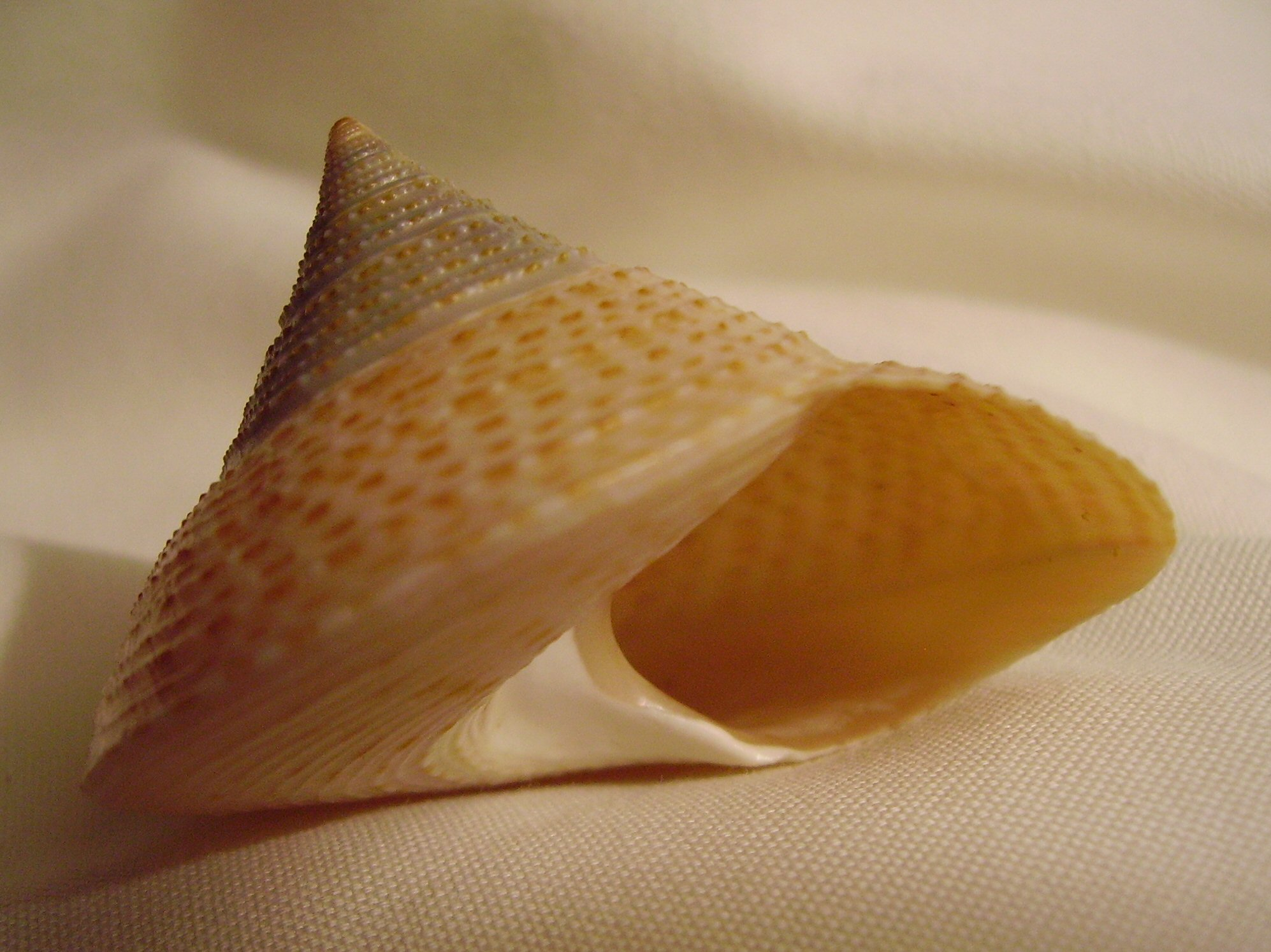
- An apertural view of a shell of Maurea selecta

Scientific classification
- Kingdom: Animalia
- Phylum: Mollusca
- Class: Gastropoda
- Subclass: Vetigastropoda
- Order: Trochida
- Superfamily: Trochoidea
- Family: Calliostomatidae; Thiele, 1924 (1847)

Genera
- See text

= Calliostomatidae =

Family of gastropods

Calliostomatidae is a family of sea snails within the superfamily Trochoidea and the clade Vetigastropoda.

== Description ==
The Calliostomatidae are unusually diverse. They are characterized by a stepped spire and a pointy aperture. They may possess or lack an umbilicus. The collumella is sometimes thicker, partially covering the aperture. The spiral whorls can differ between narrow and robust. They inhabit a wide range of ocean habitats, from the intertidal zone to mid-bathyal depths.

== Taxonomy ==
This taxon was long considered to be a subfamily of the Trochidae.

=== 2005 taxonomy ===
This family consists of two following subfamilies (according to the taxonomy of the Gastropoda by Bouchet & Rocroi, 2005):

- subfamily Calliostomatinae Thiele 1924 (1847)
  - tribe Calliostomatini Thiele 1924 (1847): synonym of Ziziphininae Gray, 1847
  - tribe Fautricini Marshall, 1995
- subfamily Thysanodontinae Marshall, 1988

=== 2008 taxonomy ===
According to Williams et al. (2008), the Calliostomatidae stays in Trochoidea. Up to 2008, there were only two species Calliostoma javanicum and Calliostoma unicum that were used in molecular phylogeny studies.

=== 2010 taxonomy ===
The first molecular phylogeny study of the family Calliostomatidae was made by Williams et al. (2010). Based on molecular data, they confirmed that Thysanodontinae Marshall, 1988 belongs to the family Calliostomatidae. It was already previously placed there based on morphological data.

=== 2016 taxonomy ===
The tribe Fautricini B. A. Marshall, 1995 was raised to the rank of subfamily Fautricinae B. A. Marshall, 1995.

== Genera ==
Genera included in this family:

Calliostomatinae

- Akoya Habe, 1961
- Alertalex Dell, 1956
- Astele Swainson, 1855
- Astelena Iredale, 1924
- Bathyfautor Marshall, 1995
- Calliostoma Swainson, 1840 - type genus
- Carinator Ikebe, 1942
- Coralastele Iredale, 1930
- Dactylastele Marshall, 1995
- Dymares Schwengel, 1942
- Eucasta Dall, 1889
- Fluxina Dall, 1881
- Laetifautor Iredale, 1929
- Maurea Oliver, 1926
- Neocalliostoma Castellanos & Fernandez, 1976
- Otukaia Ikebe, 1942
- Photinastoma Powell, 1951
- Photinula Adams, 1854
- Sinutor Cotton & Godfrey, 1935
- Tropidotrochus Parodiz, 1977
- † Venustas Allan, 1926
- Venustatrochus Powell, 1951
- Ziziphinus Gray, 1842

† Callotrochinae J. Szabó, 2011

- † Callotrochus Kutassy, 1938
- † Tylotrochus Koken, 1896

Fautricinae B. A. Marshall, 1995

- Falsimargarita Powell, 1951
- Fautrix Marshall, 1995
- Phenacomargarites B. A. Marshall, 2016
- Selastele Marshall, 1995

Margarellinae Williams, 2013

- Margarella Thiele, 1893

Thysanodontinae B. A. Marshall, 1988

- Bruceina Özdikmen, 2013
- Carinastele Marshall, 1988
- Thysanodonta Marshall, 1988

Xeniostomatinae J. H. McLean, 2012

- Xeniostoma McLean, 2012

Invalid genus names

- Ampullotrochus Monterosato, 1890: reduced in rank to Calliostoma (Ampullotrochus) Monterosato, 1890 within Calliostoma Swainson, 1840
- Benthastelena Iredale, 1936: synonym of Calliostoma Swainson, 1840
- Calliotropis Oliver, 1926: synonym of Calliostoma (Maurea) Oliver, 1926 within Calliostoma Swainson, 1840
- Callistele Cotton & Godfrey, 1935: synonym of Astele Swainson, 1855
- Callistoma Herrmannsen, 1846: misspelling of Calliostoma Swainson, 1840
- Callistomus Herrmannsen, 1846: misspelling of Calliostoma Swainson, 1840
- Calotropis Thiele, 1929: misspelling of Calliotropis Oliver, 1926
- Conulus Nardo, 1841: synonym of Calliostoma Swainson, 1840
- Elmerlinia Clench & Turner, 1960: synonym of Calliostoma Swainson, 1840
- Eutrochus A. Adams, 1864: synonym of Astele Swainson, 1855
- Fautor Iredale, 1924: reduced in rank to Calliostoma (Fautor) Iredale, 1924 within Calliostoma Swainson, 1840
- Herbertina Marshall, 1988: synonym of Bruceina Özdikmen, 2013
- Jacinthinus Monterosato, 1889: synonym of Calliostoma Swainson, 1840
- Kingotrochus Ihering, 1902: synonym of Photinula H. Adams & A. Adams, 1854
- Kombologion Clench & Turner, 1960: synonym of Calliostoma Swainson, 1840
- Leiotrochus Conrad, 1862: synonym of Calliostoma Swainson, 1840
- Margaritella Thiele, 1891: junior homonym, replaced by Margarella Thiele, 1893
- Mauriella Oliver, 1926: synonym of Calliostoma (Maurea) Oliver, 1926 within Calliostoma Swainson, 1840
- Mucrinops Finlay, 1926: synonym of Calliostoma (Maurea) Oliver, 1926 within Calliostoma Swainson, 1840
- Omphalotukaia Yoshida, 1948: synonym of Calliostoma Swainson, 1840
- Photina H. Adams & A. Adams, 1853: junior homonym, replaced by Photinula H. Adams & A. Adams, 1854
- Salsipotens Iredale, 1924: synonym of Astele Swainson, 1855
- Spicator Cotton & Godfrey, 1935: synonym of Laetifautor Iredale, 1929
- Tristichotrochus Ikebe, 1942: synonym of Calliostoma (Benthastelena) Iredale, 1936 within Calliostoma Swainson, 1840
- Venustas Finlay, 1927: synonym of Calliostoma (Maurea) Oliver, 1926 within Calliostoma Swainson, 1840
- Zizyphinus Gray, 1847: misspelling of Ziziphinus Gray, 1842
