= List of gastropods described in 2014 =

This list of gastropods described in 2014 is a list of new taxa of snails and slugs of every kind that have been described (following the rules of the ICZN) during the year 2014. For changes in taxonomy above the level of genus, see Changes in the taxonomy of gastropods since 2005.

== Marine gastropods ==
=== New species ===
==== Vetigastropoda ====
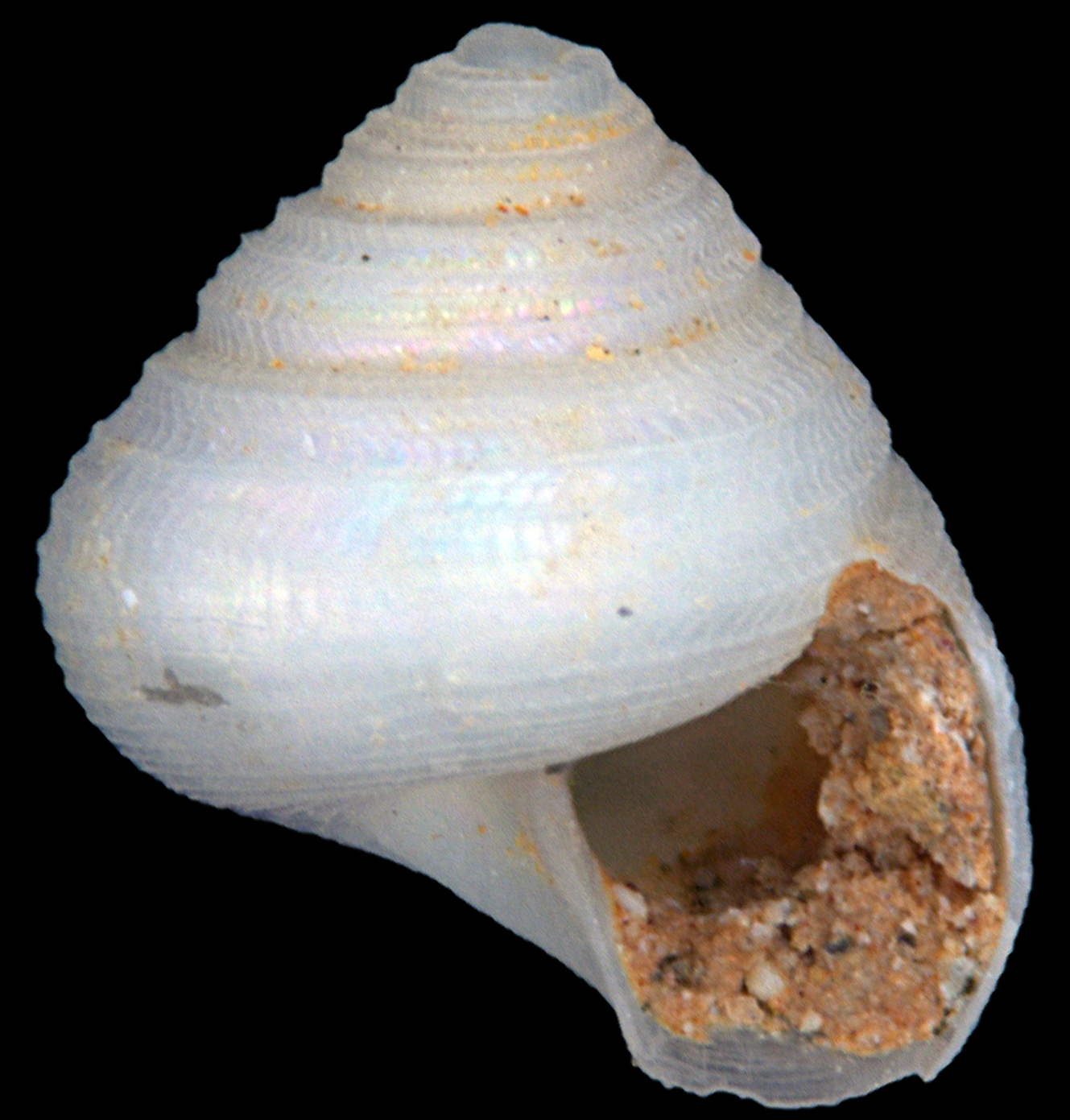
Apertural view of an empty shell of Halystina umberlee

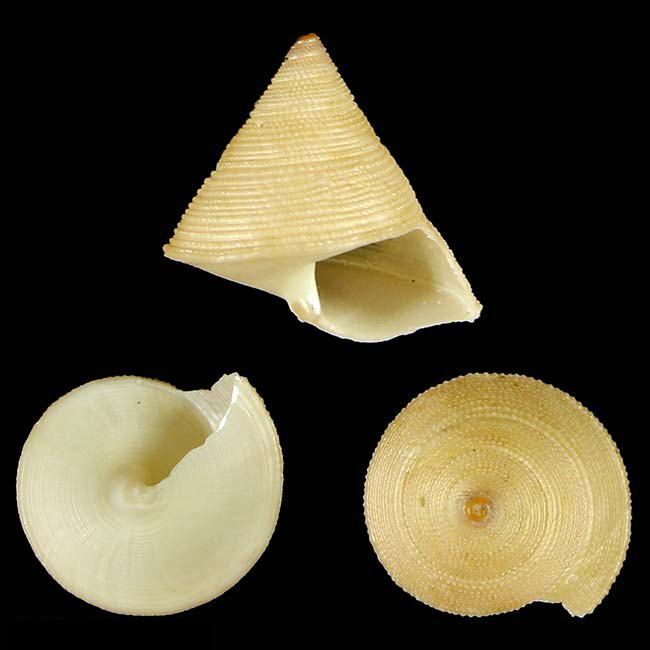
Different views of an empty shell of Calliostoma connyae

- Arxellia boucheti Vilvens, Williams & Herbert, 2014
- Arxellia erythrea Vilvens, Williams & Herbert, 2014
- Arxellia helicoides Vilvens, Williams & Herbert, 2014
- Arxellia herosae Vilvens, Williams & Herbert, 2014
- Arxellia maestratii Vilvens, Williams & Herbert, 2014
- Arxellia thaumasta Vilvens, Williams & Herbert, 2014
- Arxellia tracheia Vilvens, Williams & Herbert, 2014
- Arxellia trochos Vilvens, Williams & Herbert, 2014
- Basilissopsis bassa Lima, Christoffersen & Villacampa, 2014
- Bothropoma mediocarinata Reich & Wesselingh, 2014 † - accepted as Bothropoma mediocarinatum Reich & Wesselingh, 2014 †
- Calliostoma aikeni Lussi, 2014
- Calliostoma basulense Poppe, Tagaro & Vilvens, 2014
- Calliostoma connyae Poppe, Tagaro & Vilvens, 2014
- Calliostoma escondidum Poppe, Tagaro & Vilvens, 2014
- Calliostoma haapaiense Vilvens, 2014
- Calliostoma hematomenon Vilvens, 2014
- Calliostoma herberti Vilvens, 2014
- Calliostoma madatechnema Vilvens, 2014
- Calliostoma mesemorinon Vilvens, 2014
- Calliostoma parvajuba Vilvens, 2014
- Calliostoma polysarkon Vilvens, 2014
- Calliostoma pyrron Vilvens, 2014
- Calliostoma subalboroseum Vilvens, 2014
- Calliostoma textor Vilvens, 2014
- Calliostoma tumidosolidum Vilvens, 2014
- Calliostoma vaubanoides Vilvens, 2014
- Calliotropis (Adamsenida) chunfuleei Chino, 2014 - represented as Calliotropis chunfuleei Chino, 2014
- Calliotropis arenosa Helwerda, Wesselingh & S. T. Williams, 2014 †
- Carinastele wareni Vilvens, 2014
- Clanculus nexus Bozzetti, 2014
- Cornisepta aninga Simone & Cunha, 2014
- Cornisepta arrepiata Simone & Cunha, 2014
- Cornisepta uirapa Simone & Cunha, 2014
- Cranopsis alaris Simone & Cunha, 2014
- Cranopsis apostrema Simone & Cunha, 2014
- Cranopsis canopa Simone & Cunha, 2014
- Cranopsis cearensis Simone & Cunha, 2014
- Cranopsis columbaris Simone & Cunha, 2014
- Cranopsis enigmatica Simone & Cunha, 2014
- Cranopsis hycavis Simone & Cunha, 2014
- Cranopsis nymphalis Simone & Cunha, 2014
- Crosseola gorii Rubio & Rolán, 2014
- Emarginula suspira Simone & Cunha, 2014
- Emarginula icosisculpta Simone & Cunha, 2014
- Ethminolia wareni Helwerda, Wesselingh & S. T. Williams, 2014 †
- Falsamotrochus angulatus Gründel & Hostettler, 2014 †
- Halystina conoidea Helwerda, Wesselingh & S. T. Williams, 2014 †
- Halystina umberlee Salvador, Cavallari & Simone, 2014
- Haliotis geigeri Owen, 2014
- Hemimarginula hemitoma Simone & Cunha, 2014
- Homalopoma albobrunneum Bozzetti, 2014
- Jujubinus eleonorae Smriglio, Di Giulio & Mariottini, 2014
- Jujubinus trilloi Smriglio, Di Giulio & Mariottini, 2014
- Manganesepta atiaia Simone & Cunha, 2014
- Notocrater christofferseni Lima, 2014
- Profundisepta denudata Simone & Cunha, 2014
- Puncturella volcano Simone & Cunha, 2014
- Rasatomaria gentilii Pieroni & Nützel, 2014 †
- Rimula leptarcis Simone & Cunha, 2014
- Seguenzia triteia Salvador, Cavallari & Simone, 2014
- Zeidora crepidula Simone & Cunha, 2014
- Zeidora geigeri Helwerda & Wesselingh, 2014 †
- Zeidora pussa Simone & Cunha, 2014

==== Littorinimorpha ====
- Aenigmula criscionei Golding, 2014
- Alvania aliceae Amati, 2014
- Alvania maximilicutiani Scuderi, 2014
- Alvania nihonkaiensis Hasegawa, 2014
- Alvania yamatoensis Hasegawa, 2014
- Arganiella tabanensis Boeters, Glöer & Pešić, 2014
- Anticlimax aitormonzoni Rubio & Rolán, 2014
- Anticlimax bicarinata Rubio & Rolán, 2014
- Anticlimax bicornis Rubio & Rolán, 2014
- Anticlimax boucheti Rubio & Rolán, 2014
- Anticlimax cyclist Rubio & Rolán, 2014
- Anticlimax dentata Rubio & Rolán, 2014
- Anticlimax discus Rubio & Rolán, 2014
- Anticlimax elata Rubio & Rolán, 2014
- Anticlimax fastigata Rubio & Rolán, 2014
- Anticlimax faviformis Rubio & Rolán, 2014
- Anticlimax fecunda Rubio & Rolán, 2014
- Anticlimax fijiensis Rubio & Rolán, 2014
- Anticlimax globulus Rubio & Rolán, 2014
- Anticlimax imitatrix Rubio & Rolán, 2014
- Anticlimax infaceta Rubio & Rolán, 2014
- Anticlimax juanae Rubio & Rolán, 2014
- Anticlimax lentiformis Rubio & Rolán, 2014
- Anticlimax levis Rubio & Rolán, 2014
- Anticlimax maestratii Rubio & Rolán, 2014
- Anticlimax maranii Rubio & Rolán, 2014
- Anticlimax obesa Rubio & Rolán, 2014
- Anticlimax philippinensis Rubio & Rolán, 2014
- Anticlimax philsmithi Rubio & Rolán, 2014
- Anticlimax puncticulata Rubio & Rolán, 2014
- Anticlimax reinaudi Rubio & Rolán, 2014
- Anticlimax religiosa Rubio & Rolán, 2014
- Anticlimax rhinoceros Rubio & Rolán, 2014
- Anticlimax robusta Rubio & Rolán, 2014
- Anticlimax serrata Rubio & Rolán, 2014
- Anticlimax simplex Rubio & Rolán, 2014
- Anticlimax simplicissima Rubio & Rolán, 2014
- Anticlimax simulans Rubio & Rolán, 2014
- Anticlimax singularis Rubio & Rolán, 2014
- Anticlimax solomonensis Rubio & Rolán, 2014
- Anticlimax spiralis Rubio & Rolán, 2014
- Anticlimax tamarae Rubio & Rolán, 2014
- Anticlimax tentorii Rubio & Rolán, 2014
- Anticlimax textilis Rubio & Rolán, 2014
- Anticlimax umbiliglabra Rubio & Rolán, 2014
- Anticlimax uniformis Rubio & Rolán, 2014
- Anticlimax vanuatuensis Rubio & Rolán, 2014
- Anticlimax virginiae Rubio & Rolán, 2014
- Eunaticina abyssalis Simone,2014
- Microlinices apiculus Simone, 2014
- Microlinices benthovus Simone, 2014
- Microlinices gaiophanis Simone, 2014
- Microlinices ibitingus Simone, 2014
- Microlinices latiusculus Simone, 2014
- Microlinices ombratus Simone, 2014
- Natica jukyriuva Simone, 2014
- Natica pipoca Simone, 2014

==== Neogastropoda ====
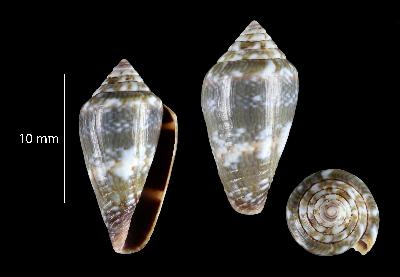
Different views of a shell of Africonus santanaensis

- Aforia serranoi Gofas, Kantor & Luque, 2014
- Africonus antoniaensis Cossignani & Fiadeiro, 2014
- Africonus antonioi Cossignani, 2014
- Africonus bernardinoi Cossignani, 2014
- Africonus cabraloi Cossignani, 2014
- Africonus cagarralensis Cossignani, 2014
- Africonus calhetinensis Cossignani & Fiadeiro, 2014
- Africonus condei Afonso & Tenorio, 2014
- Africonus cossignanii Cossignani & Fiadeiro, 2014
- Africonus diegoi Cossignani, 2014
- Africonus docensis Cossignani & Fiadeiro, 2014
- Africonus fiadeiroi Tenorio, Afonso, Cunha & Rolán, 2014
- Africonus gonsalensis Cossignani & Fiadeiro, 2014
- Africonus gonsaloi Afonso & Tenorio, 2014
- Africonus joserochoi Cossignani, 2014
- Africonus marcocastellazzii Cossignani & Fiadeiro, 2014
- Africonus morroensis Cossignani & Fiadeiro, 2014
- Africonus nelsontiagoi Cossignani & Fiadeiro, 2014
- Africonus salletae Cossignani, 2014
- Africonus santanaensis Afonso & Tenorio, 2014
- Africonus silviae Cossignani, 2014
- Africonus swinneni Tenorio, Afonso, Cunha & Rolán, 2014
- Africonus umbelinae Cossignani & Fiadeiro, 2014
- Africonus wandae Cossignani, 2014
- Africonus zinhoi Cossignani, 2014
- Americoliva grovesi Petuch & R.F. Myers, 2014
- Americoliva mcleani Petuch & R.F. Myers, 2014
- Antillophos liui S.-Q. Zhang & S.-P. Zhang, 2014
- Coltroconus henriquei Petuch & Myers, 2014
- Conasprelloides coltrorum Petuch & Myers, 2014
- Gradiconus honkerorum Petuch & Myers, 2014
- Jaspidiconus arawak Petuch & Myers, 2014
- Jaspidiconus berschaueri Petuch & Myers, 2014
- Jaspidiconus ericmonnieri Petuch & Myers, 2014
- Jaspidiconus herndli Petuch & Myers, 2014
- Jaspidiconus ogum Petuch & Myers, 2014
- Jaspidiconus poremskii Petuch & Myers, 2014
- Jaspidiconus simonei Petuch & Myers, 2014
- Lamniconus patriceae Petuch & Myers, 2014

==== Unassigned Caenogastropoda ====
- Alviniconcha adamantis S.B. Johnson, Warén, Tunnicliffe, Van Dover, Wheat, Schultz & Vrijenhoek, 2014
- Alviniconcha boucheti S.B. Johnson, Warén, Tunnicliffe, Van Dover, Wheat, Schultz & Vrijenhoek, 2014
- Alviniconcha kojimai S.B. Johnson, Warén, Tunnicliffe, Van Dover, Wheat, Schultz & Vrijenhoek, 2014
- Alviniconcha marisindica Okutani, 2014
- Alviniconcha strummeri S.B. Johnson, Warén, Tunnicliffe, Van Dover, Wheat, Schultz & Vrijenhoek, 2014
- Fusceulima saturata Souza & Pimenta, 2014
- Fusceulima toffee Souza & Pimenta, 2014

==== Marine Heterobranchia ====
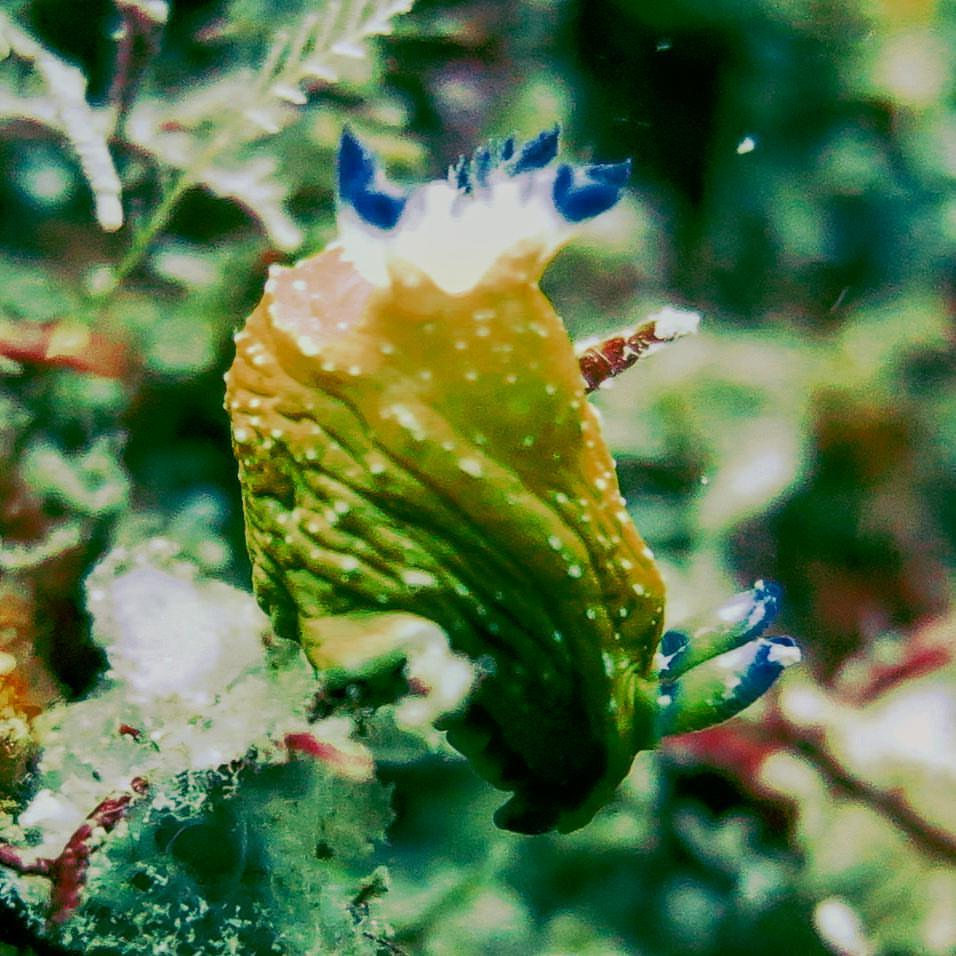
A live specimen of Tambja brasiliensis

- Ammonicera mcleani Sartori & Bieler, 2014
- Ammonicera mexicana Sartori & Bieler, 2014
- Ammonicera sleursi Sartori & Bieler, 2014
- Anteaeolidiella fijensis Carmona, Bhave, Salunkhe, Pola, Gosliner & Cervera, 2014
- Anteaeolidiella ireneae Carmona, Bhave, Salunkhe, Pola, Gosliner & Cervera, 2014
- Anteaeolidiella poshitra Carmona, Bhave, Salunkhe, Pola, Gosliner & Cervera, 2014
- Pseudotorinia phorcysi Cavallari, Salvador & Simone, 2014
- Roboastra ernsti Pola, Padula, Gosliner & Cervera, 2014
- Roboastra nikolasi Pola, Padula, Gosliner & Cervera, 2014
- Strobiligera delicata Pimenta & Fernandes, 2014
- Tambja brasiliensis Pola, Padula, Gosliner & Cervera, 2014
- Tambja crioula Pola, Padula, Gosliner & Cervera, 2014
- Tambja kava Pola, Padula, Gosliner & Cervera, 2014

=== New genera ===
- Aenigmula Golding, 2014
- Arxellia Vilvens, Williams & Herbert, 2014
- Carolesia Güller & Zelaya, 2014
- Costatohelix Gründel & Hostettler, 2014 †
- Falsamotrochus Gründel & Hostettler, 2014 †
- Laubetrochus Gründel & Hostettler, 2014 †
- Microlinices Simone, 2014
- Rasatomaria Pieroni & Nützel, 2014 †

== Freshwater gastropods ==
New species

- Arganiella tabanensis Boeters, Glöer & Pešić, 2014
- Belgrandiella bozidarcurcici Glöer & Pešić, 2014
- Bythinella istoka Glöer & Pešić, 2014
- Bythinella kazdaghensis Odabaşı & Georgiev, 2014
- Bythinella marici Glöer & Pešić, 2014
- Bythinella temelkovi Georgiev & Glöer, 2014
- Bythiospeum demattiai Glöer & Pešić, 2014
- Chilina cuyana Gutiérrez Gregoric, Ciocco & Rumi, 2014
- Chilina sanjuanina Gutiérrez Gregoric, Ciocco & Rumi, 2014
- Chirgisia alaarchaensis Glöer, Boeters & Pešić, 2014
- Clenchiella bicingulata Ponder, Fukuda & Hallan, 2014
- Clenchiella iriomotensis Ponder, Fukuda & Hallan, 2014
- Clenchiella varicosa Ponder, Fukuda & Hallan, 2014
- Coleglabra nordaustralis Ponder, Fukuda & Hallan, 2014
- Colenuda kessneri Ponder, Fukuda & Hallan, 2014
- Coliracemata clarkae Ponder, Fukuda & Hallan, 2014
- Coliracemata katurana Ponder, Fukuda & Hallan, 2014
- Coliracemata mortoni Ponder, Fukuda & Hallan, 2014
- Fluviopupa kessneri Ponder & Shea, 2014
- Iverakia hausdorfi Glöer & Pešić, 2014
- Kerkia kareli Beran, Bodon & Cianfanelli, 2014
- Plagigeyeria lukai Glöer & Pešić, 2014
- Pontohoratia smyri Vinarski, Palatov & Glöer, 2014
- Pseudamnicola goksunensis Glöer, Gürlek & Kara, 2014
- Pseudamnicola marashi Glöer, Gürlek & Kara, 2014
- Pseudamnicola merali Glöer, Gürlek & Kara, 2014
- Pyrgulopsis marilynae Hershler, Ratcliffe, Liu, Lang & Hay, 2014
- Pyrgulopsis similis Hershler, Ratcliffe, Liu, Lang & Hay, 2014
- Spiralix calida Corbella, Guillén, Prats, Tarruella & Alba, 2014
- Stenothyra gelasinosa apiosa Golding, 2014
- Stenothyra gelasinosa phrixa Golding, 2014
- Stenothyra gelasinosa gelasinosa Golding, 2014
- Stenothyra paludicola timorensis Golding, 2014
- Stenothyra paludicola topendensis Golding, 2014
- Tryonia santarosae Hershler, Landye, De la Maza-Benignos, Ornelas & Carson, 2014
- Zeteana ljiljanae Glöer & Pešić, 2014

New genera

- Chirgisia Glöer, Boeters & Pešić, 2014
- Coleglabra Ponder, Fukuda & Hallan, 2014
- Colenuda Ponder, Fukuda & Hallan, 2014
- Coliracemata Ponder, Fukuda & Hallan, 2014
- Iverakia Glöer & Pešić, 2014
- Motsametia Vinarski, Palatov & Glöer, 2014
- Pontohoratia Vinarski, Palatov & Glöer, 2014
- Zeteana Glöer & Pešić, 2014

== Land gastropods ==
=== New species ===
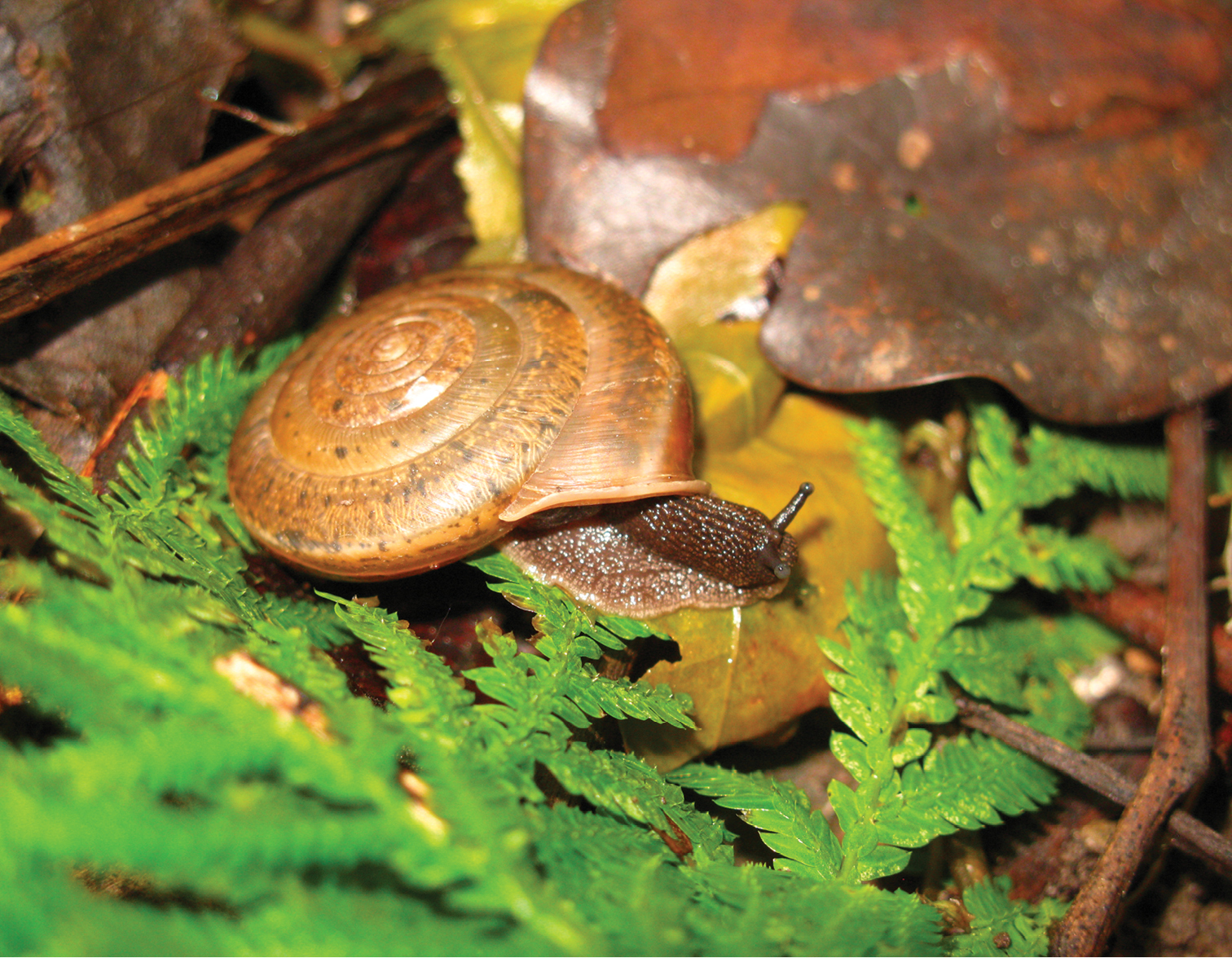
A live individual of Aegista diversifamilia, a new species described by Huang, Lee, Lin & Wu in 2014

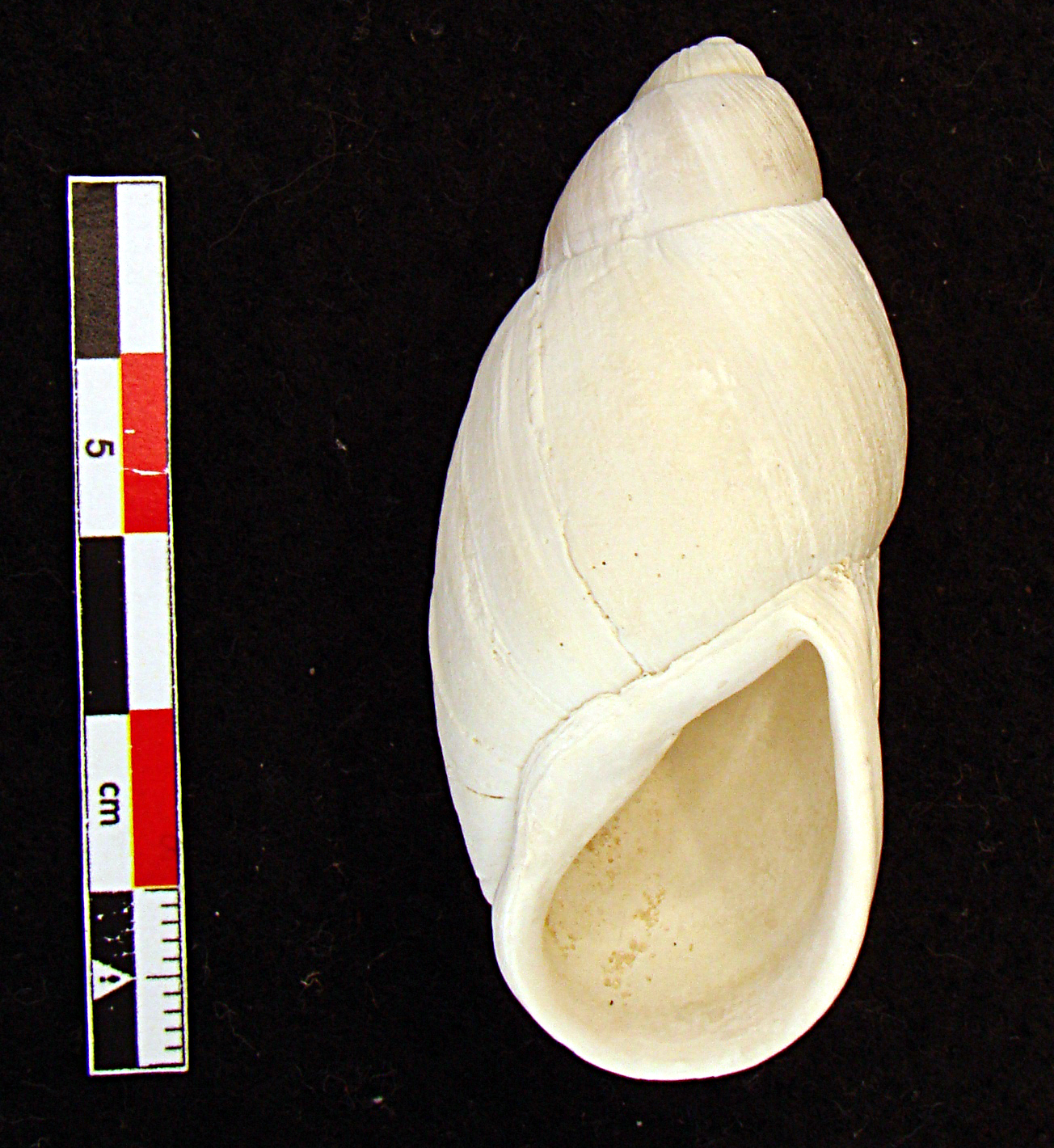
A shell of Megalobulimus jaguarunensis, discovered in Brazilian shell mounds in 2014

- Adelopoma paulistanum Martins & Simone, 2014
- Aegista diversifamilia Huang, Lee, Lin & Wu, 2014
- Albinaria caerulea kefalos Nordsieck, 2014
- Albinaria freytagi insularum Nordsieck, 2014
- Albinaria inauris hausdorfi Nordsieck, 2014
- Albinaria inauris podanii Nordsieck, 2014
- Albinaria ithomensis raehlei Nordsieck, 2014
- Albinaria munda milasensi Nordsieck, 2014
- Ambrosiella floreanae Miquel & Herrera, 2014
- Amphidromus laevus janetabbasae Parsons, 2014
- Amphidromus laevus nusleti Parsons, 2014
- Amphidromus naggsi Thach & Huber, 2014
- Angustopila huoyani Jochum, Slapnik & Páll-Gergely in Jochum, Slapnik, Kampschulte, Martels, Heneka & Páll-Gergely, 2014
- Arion luisae Borredà & Martínez-Orti, 2014
- Baudinella magna Criscione & Köhler, 2014
- Baudinella margaritata Criscione & Köhler, 2014
- Bensonella plicidens lakainguta Hwang, 2014
- Bostryx roselleus Miranda & Cuezzo, 2014
- Bradybaena virgo mongolia Wang & Zhou in Wang, Xiao, Zhou & Hwang, 2014
- Boysidia xianfengensis Zhang, Chen & Zhou, 2014
- Boysidia xiaoguanensis Zhang, Chen & Zhou, 2014
- Camaena liqianae Jiang, Wu & He, 2014
- Candidula arrabidensis Holyoak & Holyoak, 2014
- Candidula carrapateirensis Holyoak & Holyoak, 2014
- Candidula ponsulensis Holyoak & Holyoak, 2014
- Cardiotrachia bastionensis Criscione & Köhler, 2014
- Carinartemis striatus Siriboon & Panha in Siriboon, Sutcharit, Naggs, Rowson & Panha, 2014
- Carinartemis vesperus Siriboon & Panha in Siriboon, Sutcharit, Naggs, Rowson & Panha, 2014
- Charopa lafargei Vermeulen & Marzuki, 2014
- Chondrulopsina mojurumika Gaibnazarova & Pazilov in Gaibnazarova, Pazilov & Kychboev, 2014
- Cyclodontina tapuia Salvador & Simone, 2014
- Cyclophorus abditus Nantarat & Panha in Nantarat, Wade, Jeratthitiku, Sutcharit & Panha, 2014
- Discartemon afthonodontia Siriboon & Panha in Siriboon, Sutcharit, Naggs, Rowson & Panha, 2014
- Discartemon circulus Siriboon & Panha in Siriboon, Sutcharit, Naggs, Rowson & Panha, 2014
- Discartemon conicus Siriboon & Panha in Siriboon, Sutcharit, Naggs, Rowson & Panha, 2014
- Discartemon deprima Siriboon & Panha in Siriboon, Sutcharit, Naggs, Rowson & Panha, 2014
- Discartemon discadentus Siriboon & Panha in Siriboon, Sutcharit, Naggs, Rowson & Panha, 2014
- Discartemon discamaximus Siriboon & Panha in Siriboon, Sutcharit, Naggs, Rowson & Panha, 2014
- Discartemon epipedis Siriboon & Panha in Siriboon, Sutcharit, Naggs, Rowson & Panha, 2014
- Discartemon expandus Siriboon & Panha in Siriboon, Sutcharit, Naggs, Rowson & Panha, 2014
- Discartemon flavacandida Siriboon & Panha in Siriboon, Sutcharit, Naggs, Rowson & Panha, 2014
- Discartemon kotanensis Siriboon & Panha in Siriboon, Sutcharit, Naggs, Rowson & Panha, 2014
- Discartemon megalostraka Siriboon & Panha in Siriboon, Sutcharit, Naggs, Rowson & Panha, 2014
- Discartemon triancus Siriboon & Panha in Siriboon, Sutcharit, Naggs, Rowson & Panha, 2014
- Eucalodium aglacyma Thompson, 2014
- Eucalodium arduum Thompson, 2014
- Eucalodium cervinus Thompson, 2014
- Eucalodium comalapense Thompson, 2014
- Eucalodium cyclops Thompson, 2014
- Eucalodium erugatum Thompson, 2014
- Eucalodium eurystoma Thompson, 2014
- Eucalodium filicostatum Thompson, 2014
- Eucalodium huehuetenangoense Thompson, 2014
- Eucalodium obesum Thompson, 2014
- Eucalodium slapcinskyi Thompson, 2014
- Eucalodium smithi Thompson, 2014
- Euryauchenia demangei dextroversa Nordsieck, 2014
- Gudeodiscus marmoreus Páll-Gergely in Páll-Gergely & Asami, 2014
- Gulella proxima Van Bruggen, 2014
- Hemicycla idairae Verbinnen & Swinnen, 2014
- Hypselostoma kentingensis Hwang, 2014
- Indoartemon medius Siriboon & Panha in Siriboon, Sutcharit, Naggs, Rowson & Panha, 2014
- Insulivitrina raquelae Valido, Yanes, Alosno & Ibáñez, 2014
- Janulus traviesus Castro, Yanes, García, Alonso & Ibáñez, 2014
- Kimberleytrachia jacksonensis Criscione & Köhler, 2014
- Kimberleytrachia leopardus Criscione & Köhler, 2014
- Kimberleytrachia nelsonensis Criscione & Köhler, 2014
- Kimberleytrachia serrata Criscione & Köhler, 2014
- Kimberleytrachia setosa Criscione & Köhler, 2014
- Kimberleytrachia silvaepluvialis Criscione & Köhler, 2014
- Laotia christahemmenae Páll-Gergely, 2014
- Leiostracus faerie Salvador & Cavallari, 2014
- Leiostracus fetidus Salvador & Cavallari, 2014
- Mautodontha domaneschii Sartori, Gargominy & Fontaine, 2014
- Mautodontha virginiae Sartori, Gargominy & Fontaine, 2014
- Mautodontha harperae Sartori, Gargominy & Fontaine, 2014
- Mautodontha aurora Sartori, Gargominy & Fontaine, 2014
- Mautodontha occidentalis Sartori, Gargominy & Fontaine, 2014
- Mautodontha temaoensis Sartori, Gargominy & Fontaine, 2014
- Mautodontha makateaensis Sartori, Gargominy & Fontaine, 2014
- Mautodontha passosi Sartori, Gargominy & Fontaine, 2014
- Mautodontha spelunca Sartori, Gargominy & Fontaine, 2014
- Megalobulimus jaguarunensis Fontenelle, Cavallari & Simone, 2014
- Mirus jejuensis Park, 2014
- Molema tenuicostata Criscione & Köhler, 2014
- Kleokyphus cowiei Sartori, Gargominy & Fontaine, 2014
- Parachloritis afranio Köhler & Kessner, 2014
- Parachloritis atauroensis Köhler & Kessner, 2014
- Parachloritis baucauensis Köhler & Kessner, 2014
- Parachloritis herculea Köhler & Kessner, 2014
- Parachloritis laritame Köhler & Kessner, 2014
- Parachloritis malukuensis Köhler & Kessner, 2014
- Parachloritis manuelmendesi Köhler & Kessner, 2014
- Parachloritis mundiperdidi Köhler & Kessner, 2014
- Parachloritis ninokonisi Köhler & Kessner, 2014
- Parachloritis nusatenggarae Köhler & Kessner, 2014
- Parachloritis pseudolandouria Köhler & Kessner, 2014
- Parachloritis ramelau Köhler & Kessner, 2014
- Parachloritis reidi Köhler & Kessner, 2014
- Parachloritis renschi Köhler & Kessner, 2014
- Parachloritis sylvatica Köhler & Kessner, 2014
- Paradoxipoma enigmaticum Watters, 2014
- Plectostoma davisoni Liew, Vermeulen, Marzuki & Schilthuizen, 2014
- Plectostoma dindingensis Liew, Vermeulen, Marzuki & Schilthuizen, 2014
- Plectostoma ikanensis Liew, Vermeulen, Marzuki & Schilthuizen, 2014
- Plectostoma kakiense Liew, Vermeulen, Marzuki & Schilthuizen, 2014
- Plectostoma kayiani Liew, Vermeulen, Marzuki & Schilthuizen, 2014
- Plectostoma kubuensis Liew, Vermeulen, Marzuki & Schilthuizen, 2014
- Plectostoma mengaburensis Liew, Vermeulen, Marzuki & Schilthuizen, 2014
- Plectostoma relauensis Liew, Vermeulen, Marzuki & Schilthuizen, 2014
- Plectostoma tenggekensis Liew, Vermeulen, Marzuki & Schilthuizen, 2014
- Plectostoma tohchinyawi Liew, Vermeulen, Marzuki & Schilthuizen, 2014
- Phuphania costata Tumpeesuwan & Tumpeesuwan, 2014
- Pseudolibera solemi Sartori, Gargominy & Fontaine, 2014
- Pseudolibera matthieui Sartori, Gargominy & Fontaine, 2014
- Pseudolibera cookei Sartori, Gargominy & Fontaine, 2014
- Pseudolibera aubertdelaruei Sartori, Gargominy & Fontaine, 2014
- Pseudolibera extincta Sartori, Gargominy & Fontaine, 2014
- Pseudolibera paraminderae Sartori, Gargominy & Fontaine, 2014
- Pseudolibera elieporoii Sartori, Gargominy & Fontaine, 2014
- Pseudolibera parva Sartori, Gargominy & Fontaine, 2014
- Pterocyclos diluvium Sutcharit & Panha in Sutcharit, Tonkerd & Panha, 2014
- Pterocyclos frednaggsi Sutcharit & Panha in Sutcharit, Tonkerd & Panha, 2014
- Pupilla kyrostriata Walther & Hausdorf, 2014
- Rachita carltonensis Criscione & Köhler, 2014
- Rhagada abbasi Köhler, 2014
- Rhagada setzeri atauroensis Köhler, 2014
- Raphaulus tonkinensis Páll-Gergely, 2014
- Retroterra dichroma Criscione & Köhler, 2014
- Retroterra nana Criscione & Köhler, 2014
- Satsuma wenshini Wu & Tsai, 2014
- Sicradiscus vargabalinti Páll-Gergely in Páll-Gergely & Asami, 2014
- Tandonia bolensis De Mattia & Nardi, 2014
- Taurinellushka babugana Balashov, 2014
- Vermetum tamadabaensis Holyoak, Holyoak, Yanes, Santana, García, Castro, Artiles, Alonso & Ibáñez, 2014
- Vitrea ulrichi Georgiev & Dedov, 2014
- Zilchistrophia hilaryae Páll-Gergely in Páll-Gergely & Asami, 2014
- Zilchistrophia shiwiarorum Páll-Gergely in Páll-Gergely & Asami, 2014

=== New genera ===
- Cardiotrachia Criscione & Köhler, 2014
- Eucalodium (Bradyplax) Thompson, 2014
- Carinartemis Siriboon & Panha in Siriboon, Sutcharit, Naggs, Rowson & Panha, 2014
- Paradoxipoma Watters, 2014
- Rachita Criscione & Köhler, 2014
- Taurinellushka Balashov, 2014

== See also ==
- List of gastropods described in 2013
- List of gastropods described in 2015
