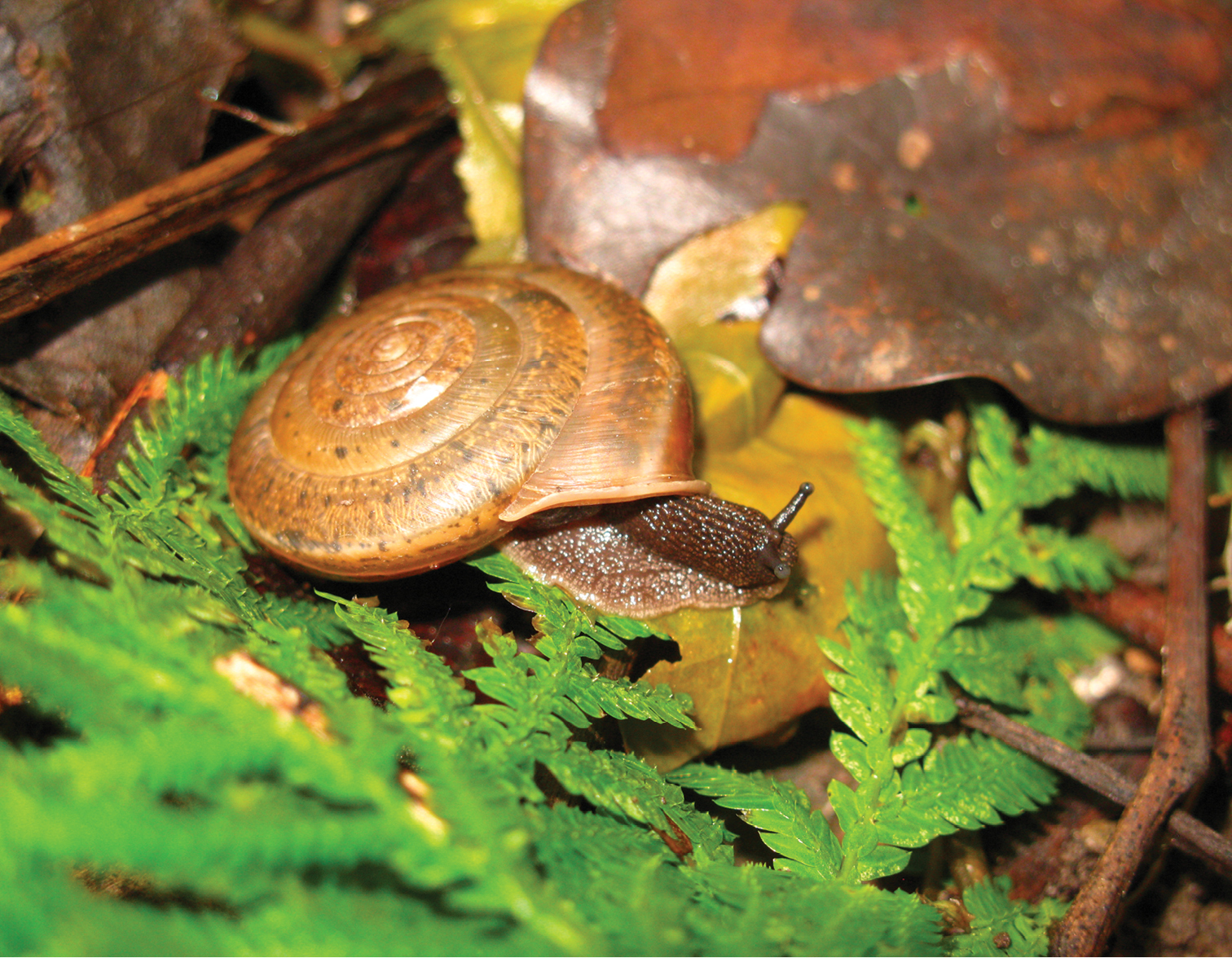
- Live individual from Xiulin, Hualien

Scientific classification
- Kingdom: Animalia
- Phylum: Mollusca
- Class: Gastropoda
- Order: Stylommatophora
- Family: Camaenidae
- Genus: Aegista
- Species: A. diversifamilia

Binomial name
- Aegista diversifamilia Huang, Lee, Lin & Wu, 2014

= Aegista diversifamilia =

Species of gastropod

Aegista diversifamilia is a species of air-breathing land snails, a terrestrial pulmonate gastropod mollusc from Taiwan.

== Discovery and naming ==
A. diversifamilia was previously identified as being part of the species A. subchinensis, which was known to occur throughout most of Taiwan. In 2003, a paper was published remarking on the morphological and genetic difference between the eastern and western populations of the species. Eventually it was established that the eastern population was a separate species, divided from A. subchinensis by the Lanyang River.

The new species' name is derived from Latin diversus and familia. The name was chosen in recognition of the same-sex marriage movement in Taiwan and worldwide. Dr. Yen-Chang Lee, co-author of the ZooKeys paper describing the species, said: "When we were preparing the manuscript, it was a period when Taiwan and many other countries and states were struggling for the recognition of same-sex marriage rights. It reminded us that Pulmonata land snails are hermaphrodite animals, which means they have both male and female reproductive organs in single individual. They represent the diversity of sex orientation in the animal kingdom. We decided that maybe this is a good occasion to name the snail to remember the struggle for the recognition of same-sex marriage rights." A. diversifamilia was selected as one of the top 10 new species in 2014.

== Description ==
The shell is depressed and spherical, between 1.98 centimetres (0.78 in) and 3.24 centimetres (1.28 in) wide and 0.97 centimetres (0.38 in) to 1.68 centimetres (0.66 in) high. The shell is thin but strong, with a depressed conic spire. The aperture is ovate, 0.78 centimetres (0.31 in) to 1.32 centimetres (0.52 in) wide by 0.48 centimetres (0.19 in) to 1.05 centimetres (0.41 in) tall.

The shell is a glossy chestnut- or yellow-brown, with a thin light brown stripe running along the periphery. The peristome is white.

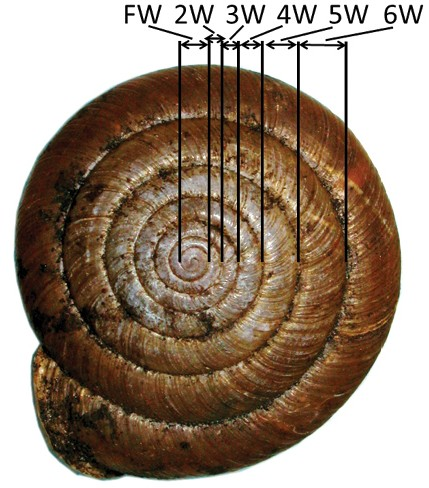
Apical view.

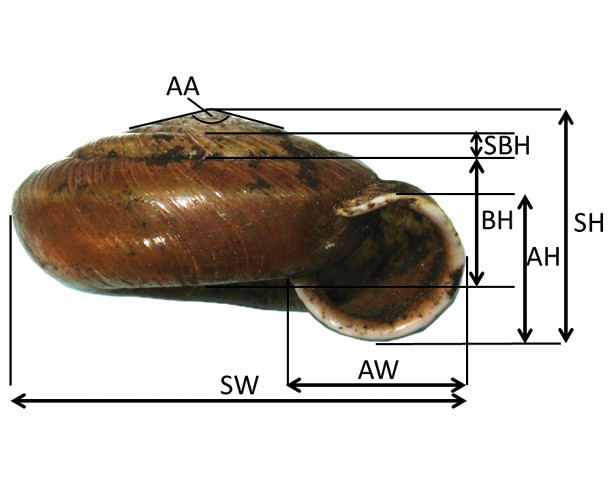
Apertural view.

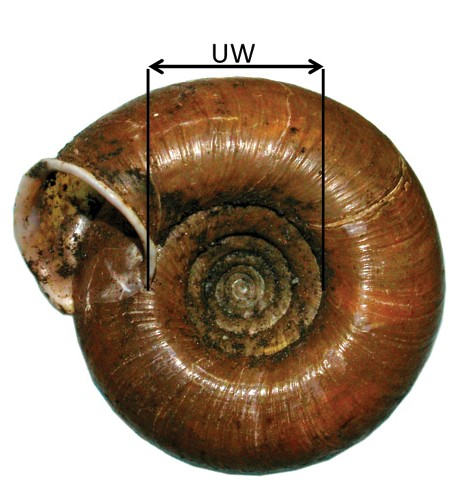
Umbilical view.

=== Reproductive system ===
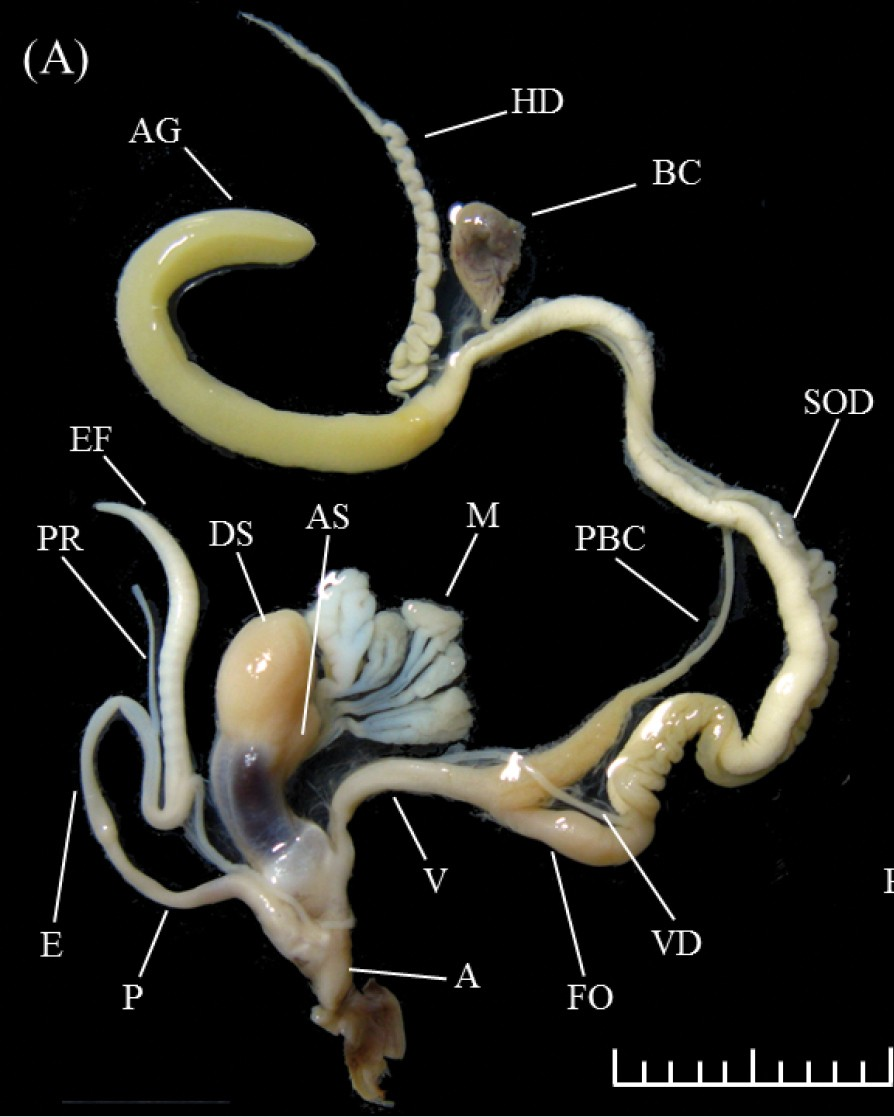
Reproductive system of Aegista diversifamilia.

A. diversifamilia is hermaphroditic. The penis is long and thin, but shorter than the epiphallus. The dart sac is positioned in the vagina, which is equal in length to the penis. The spermoviduct is approximately four times as long as the penis and oviduct, and two times as long as the hermaphroditic duct. Individuals lay 20–30 white, 3 mm diameter round eggs per spawning.

== Distribution and habitat ==
A. diversifamilia is endemic to eastern Taiwan, bounded on the north by the Lanyang River. It is found in the Yilan and Hualien Counties, but not on Guishan Island.

The species is usually found in lowland hardwood forests, living in or under moist leaf litter.
