= Conus diegoi =

Scientific classification
- Kingdom: Animalia
- Phylum: Mollusca
- Class: Gastropoda
- Subclass: Caenogastropoda
- Order: Neogastropoda
- Superfamily: Conoidea
- Family: Conidae
- Genus: Conus
- Species: C. diegoi

Binomial name
- Conus diegoi (Cossignani, 2014)

Synonyms
- Africonus diegoi Cossignani, 2014 (original combination); Conus (Lautoconus) diegoi (Cossignani, 2014) · accepted, alternate representation

Species of sea snail

Conus diegoi is a species of sea snail, a marine gastropod mollusc in the family Conidae, the cone snails, cone shells or cones.

These snails are predatory and venomous. They are capable of stinging humans.

== Description ==
The size of the shell attains 13 mm.

== Distribution ==
This species occurs in the Atlantic Ocean off Boa Vista Island, Cape Verde.
