= Alvania maximilicutiani =

Scientific classification
- Kingdom: Animalia
- Phylum: Mollusca
- Class: Gastropoda
- Subclass: Caenogastropoda
- Order: Littorinimorpha
- Superfamily: Rissooidea
- Family: Rissoidae
- Genus: Alvania
- Species: A. maximilicutiani

Binomial name
- Alvania maximilicutiani Scuderi, 2014

Species of gastropod

Alvania maximilicutiani is a species of small sea snail, a marine gastropod mollusk or micromollusk in the family Rissoidae.

== Description ==
The species' shell has a small, ovate-conical shape. It has 4 1/2 whorls, with the last whorl making up 76% of the shell height. The shell has axial ribs crossed by spinal cords, producing a reticulated (net-like) structure. The protoconch has a distinctive brown colour, which helps separate the species from other Alvania-genus species.

== Distribution ==
This marine species has been first discovered at San Giovanni li Cuti, Catania, Sicily, Italy where it was first collected in shallow rocky coastal waters. However, due to its extremely small size of just 1 mm, the species may have a greater distribution but have gone unnoticed.
