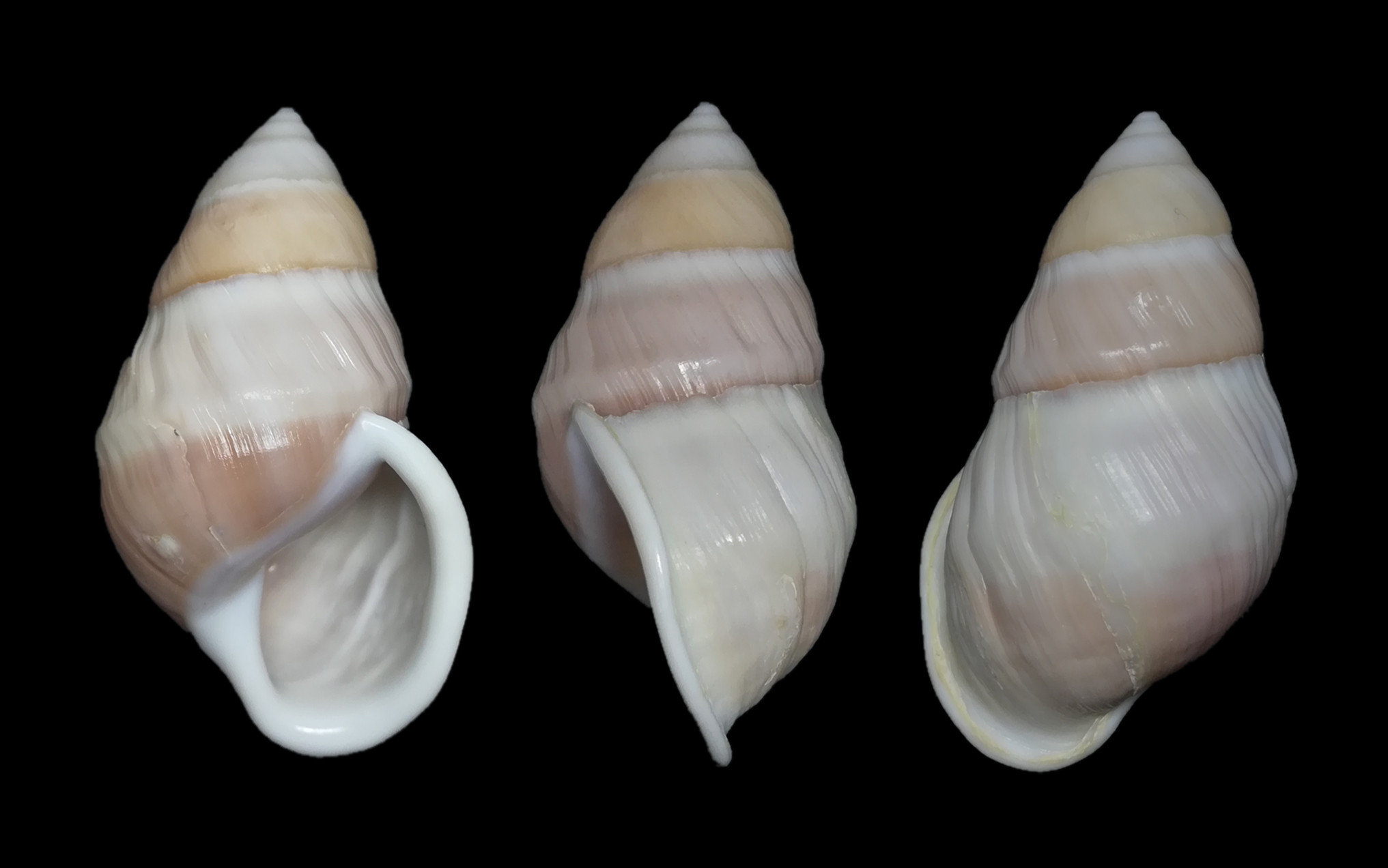

Scientific classification
- Kingdom: Animalia
- Phylum: Mollusca
- Class: Gastropoda
- Order: Stylommatophora
- Family: Camaenidae
- Genus: Amphidromus
- Species: A. naggsi

Binomial name
- Amphidromus naggsi Thach & Huber, 2014

= Amphidromus naggsi =

Species of snail in the family Camaenidae

Amphidromus naggsi is a species of large-sized air-breathing tree snail, an arboreal gastropod mollusk in the family Camaenidae.

== Habitat ==
Ground dwellers, living among litter around trees.

== Distribution ==
The type locality of this species is Lâm Đồng Province, Vietnam.

== Etymology ==
This species is named after Prof. Fred Naggs from U.K.
