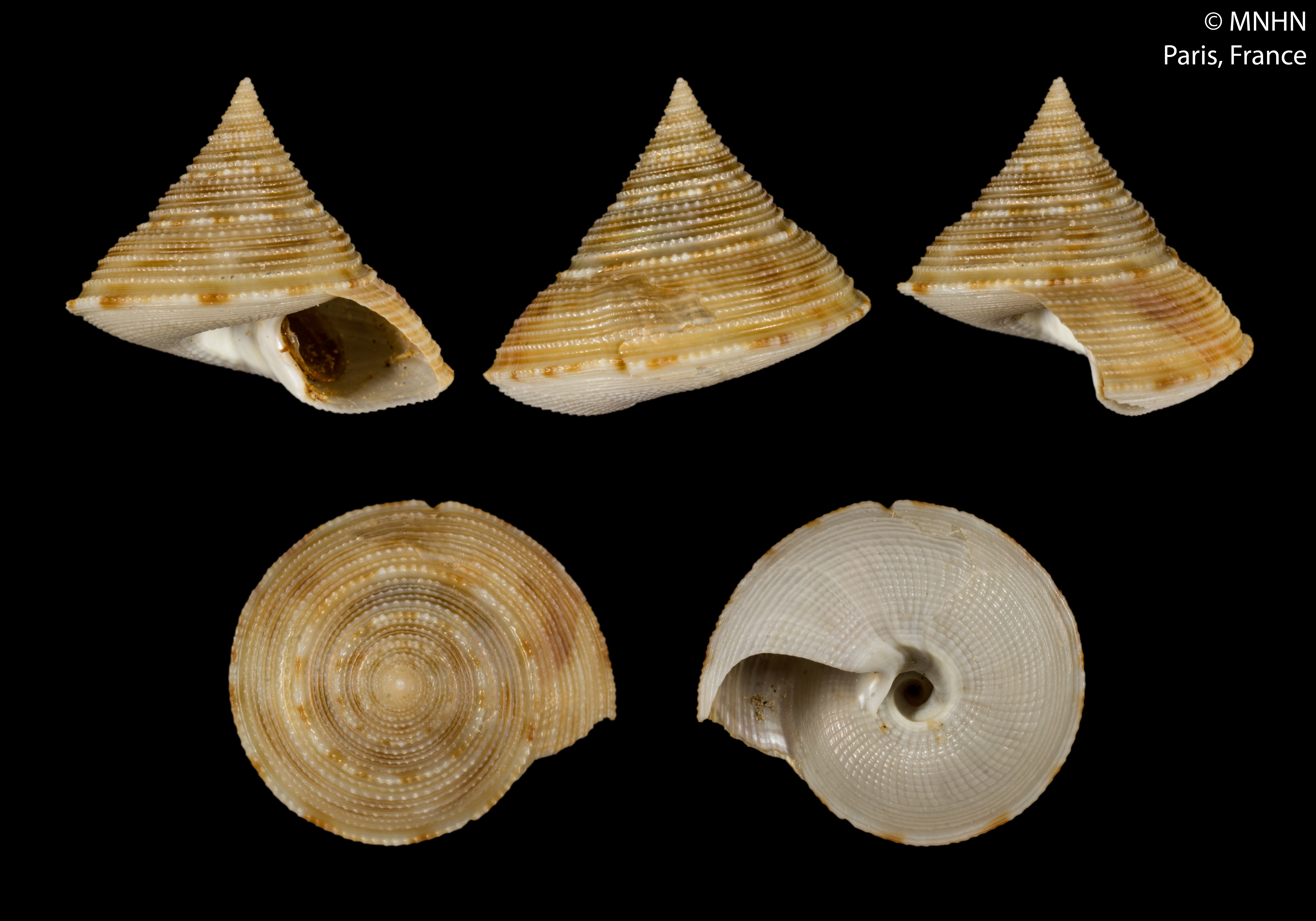
- Shell of Calliostoma madatechnema (holotype at MNHN, Paris)

Scientific classification
- Kingdom: Animalia
- Phylum: Mollusca
- Class: Gastropoda
- Subclass: Vetigastropoda
- Order: Trochida
- Superfamily: Trochoidea
- Family: Calliostomatidae
- Subfamily: Calliostomatinae
- Genus: Calliostoma
- Species: C. madatechnema

Binomial name
- Calliostoma madatechnema Vilvens, 2014

= Calliostoma madatechnema =

Species of gastropod

Calliostoma madatechnema is a species of sea snail, a marine gastropod mollusk, in the family Calliostomatidae within the superfamily Trochoidea, the top snails, turban snails and their allies.

== Distribution ==
This species occurs in Mozambique Channel.
