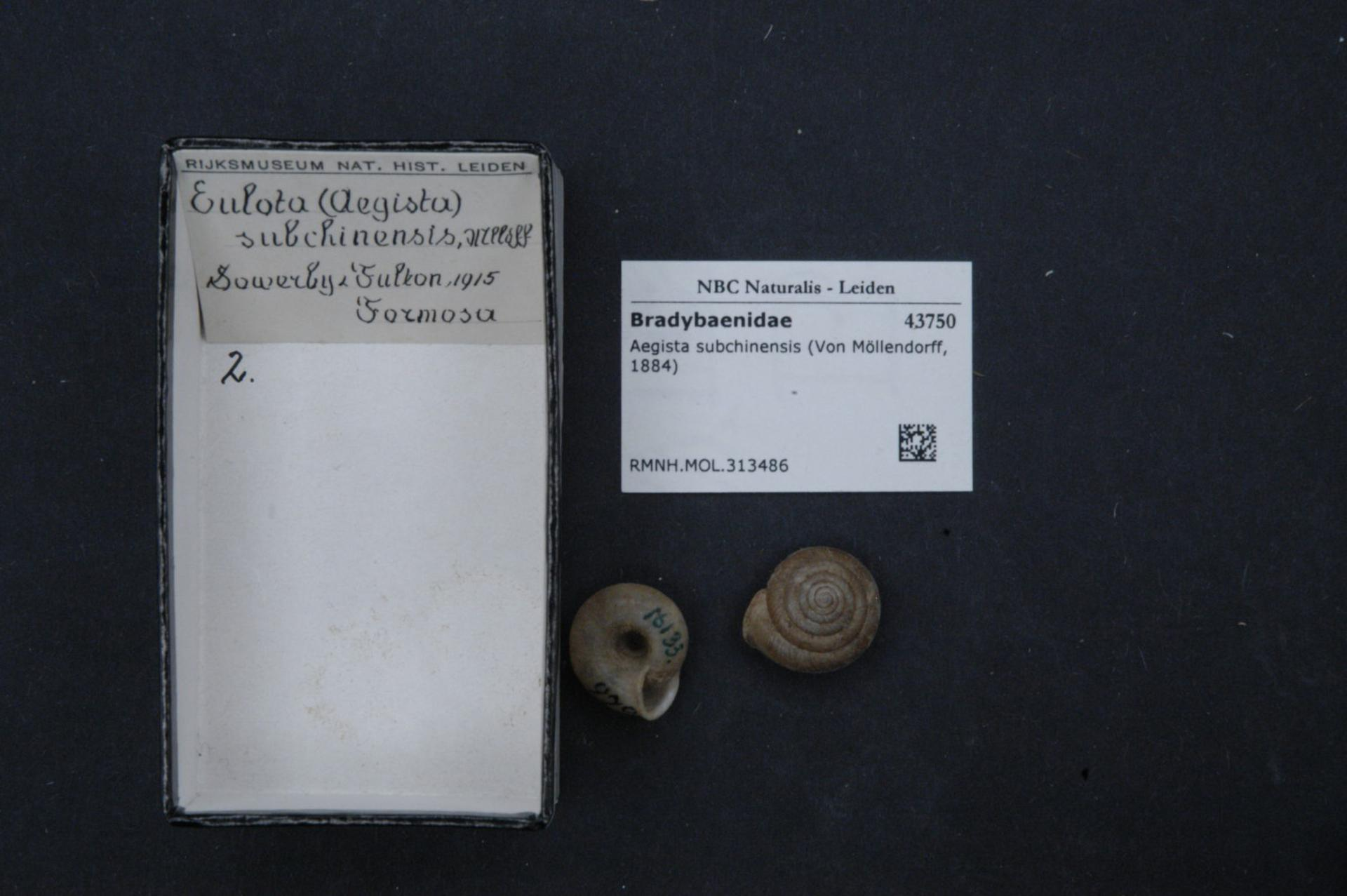
- Aegista subchinensis shell

Conservation status
- Data Deficient (IUCN 2.3)

Scientific classification
- Kingdom: Animalia
- Phylum: Mollusca
- Class: Gastropoda
- Order: Stylommatophora
- Family: Camaenidae
- Subfamily: Bradybaeninae
- Tribe: Aegistini
- Genus: Aegista
- Species: A. subchinensis

Binomial name
- Aegista subchinensis (Möllendorff, 1884)
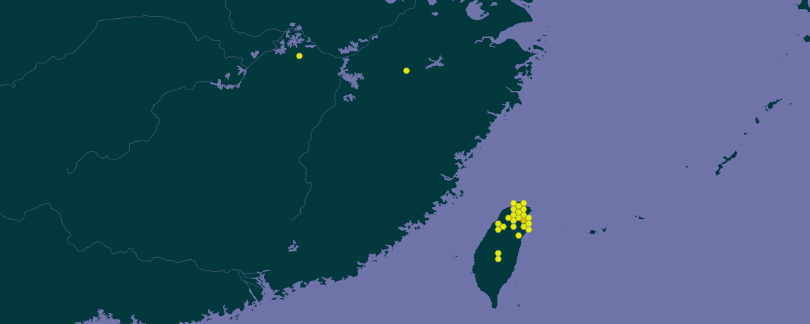

Synonyms
- Helix subchinensis Möllendorff, 1884 (original combination)

= Aegista subchinensis =

Species of gastropod

Aegista subchinensis (台灣大臍蝸牛; 'Taiwan's umbilical snail') is a species of air-breathing land snail, a terrestrial pulmonate gastropod mollusc in the family Camaenidae.

== Description ==
The diameter of the shell attains 17 mm.

The shell exhibits a pronounced umbilicus. It is semi-translucent. The glossy shell shows oblique striations. It is colored chestnut with a slender white band. It consists of seven slightly convex whorls, with the body whorl gently sloping forward and subtly angled at the periphery. The whitish peristome is thickened and narrowly turned outward.

== Distribution ==
This species is endemic to the island of Taiwan.
