= Conus calhetinensis =

Scientific classification
- Kingdom: Animalia
- Phylum: Mollusca
- Class: Gastropoda
- Subclass: Caenogastropoda
- Order: Neogastropoda
- Superfamily: Conoidea
- Family: Conidae
- Genus: Conus
- Species: C. calhetinensis

Binomial name
- Conus calhetinensis (Cossignani & Fiadeiro, 2014)

Synonyms
- Africonus calhetinensis Cossignani & Fiadeiro, 2014

Species of sea snail

Conus calhetinensis is a species of sea snail, a marine gastropod mollusk in the family Conidae, the cone snails, cone shells or cones.

These snails are predatory and venomous. They are capable of stinging humans.

== Description ==
The length of the shell varies between 9 mm and 11 mm.

== Distribution ==
This marine species is found in the Atlantic Ocean off Boa Vista Island, Cape Verde.
