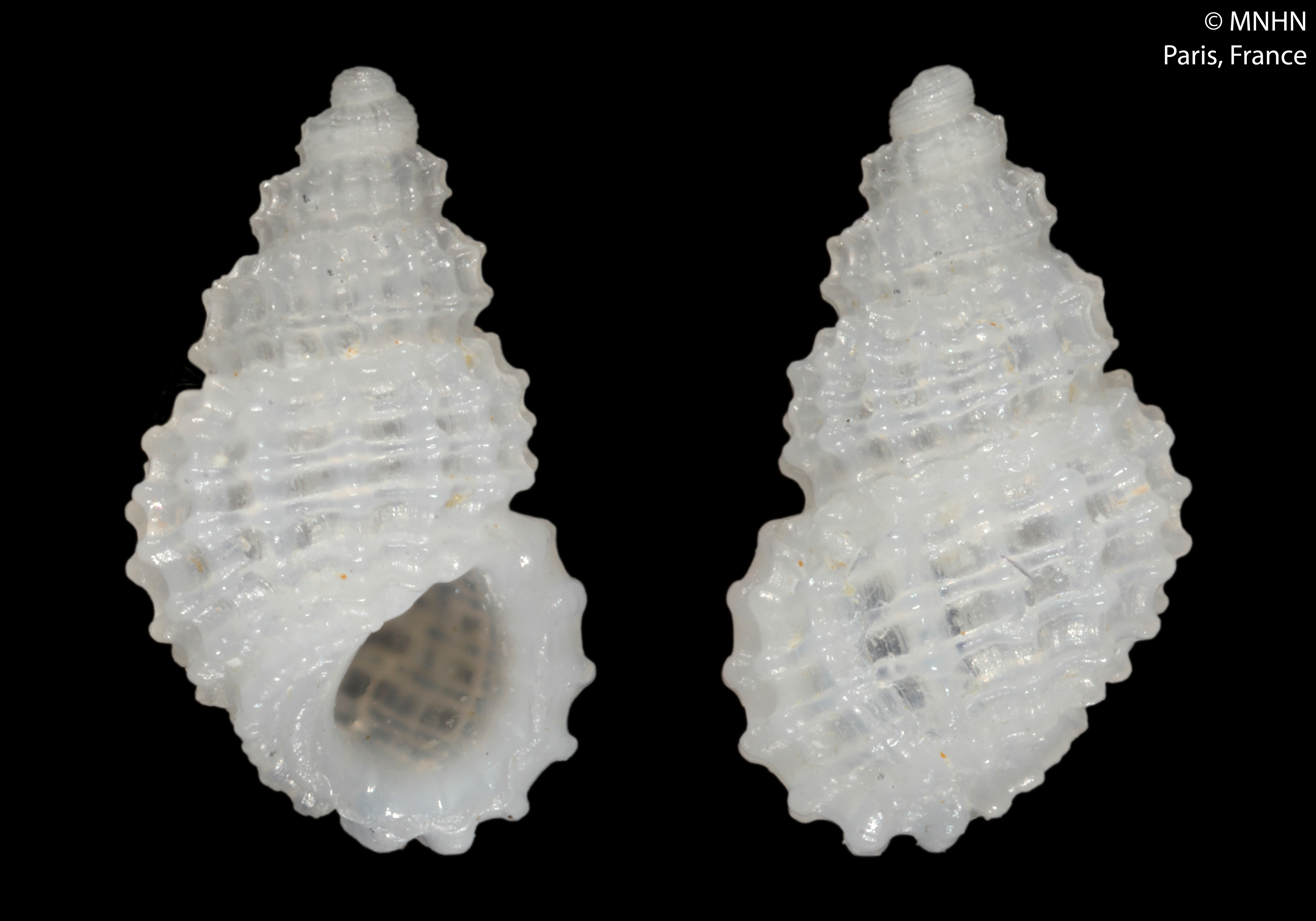
- Shell of Alvania aliceae (holotype at MNHN, Paris)

Scientific classification
- Kingdom: Animalia
- Phylum: Mollusca
- Class: Gastropoda
- Subclass: Caenogastropoda
- Order: Littorinimorpha
- Superfamily: Rissooidea
- Family: Rissoidae
- Genus: Alvania
- Species: A. aliceae

Binomial name
- Alvania aliceae Amati, 2014

= Alvania aliceae =

Species of gastropod

Alvania aliceae is a species of small sea snail, a marine gastropod mollusk or micromollusk in the family Rissoidae.

== Description ==
The length of the shell attains 2.6 mm.

== Distribution ==
This species occurs in the Mediterranean Sea off Lampedusa, Italy.
