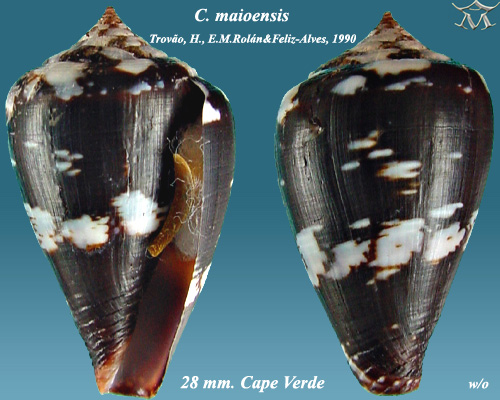
- Apertural and abapertural views of shell of Conus maioensis
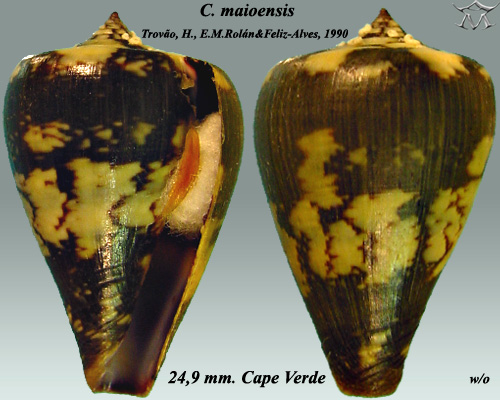

Conservation status
- Least Concern (IUCN 3.1)

Scientific classification
- Kingdom: Animalia
- Phylum: Mollusca
- Class: Gastropoda
- Subclass: Caenogastropoda
- Order: Neogastropoda
- Superfamily: Conoidea
- Family: Conidae
- Genus: Conus
- Species: C. maioensis

Binomial name
- Conus maioensis Tenorio, Afonso, & Rolán, 2008

Synonyms
- Africonus cossignanii T. Cossignani & Fiadeiro, 2014; Africonus crioulus (M. Tenorio & Afonso, 2004); Africonus decolrobertoi T. Cossignani & Fiadeiro, 2017; Africonus maioensis (Trovão, Rolán & Félix-Alves, 1990) alternative representation; Africonus marcocastellazzii T. Cossignani & Fiadeiro, 2014; Africonus zinhoi T. Cossignani, 2014 (original combination); Conus (Lautoconus) crioulus M. Tenorio & Afonso, 2004; Conus (Lautoconus) maioensis Trovão, Rolán & Félix-Alves, 1990; Conus (Lautoconus) marcocastellazzii (T. Cossignani & Fiadeiro, 2014); Conus (Lautoconus) zinhoi (T. Cossignani, 2014); Conus crioulus M. Tenorio & Afonso, 2004; Conus marcocastellazzii (T. Cossignani & Fiadeiro, 2014); Conus zinhoi (T. Cossignani, 2014)

= Conus maioensis =

Species of sea snail

Conus maioensis is a species of sea snail, a marine gastropod mollusk in the family Conidae, the cone snails and their allies.

Like all species within the genus Conus, these snails are predatory and venomous. They are capable of stinging humans, therefore live ones should be handled carefully or not at all.

== Description ==
The size of the shell varies between 15 mm and 40 mm.

== Distribution ==
This species occurs in the Eastern Atlantic Ocean, along the northern coast of the island of Maio, Cape Verde. Its conservation status is least concern.
