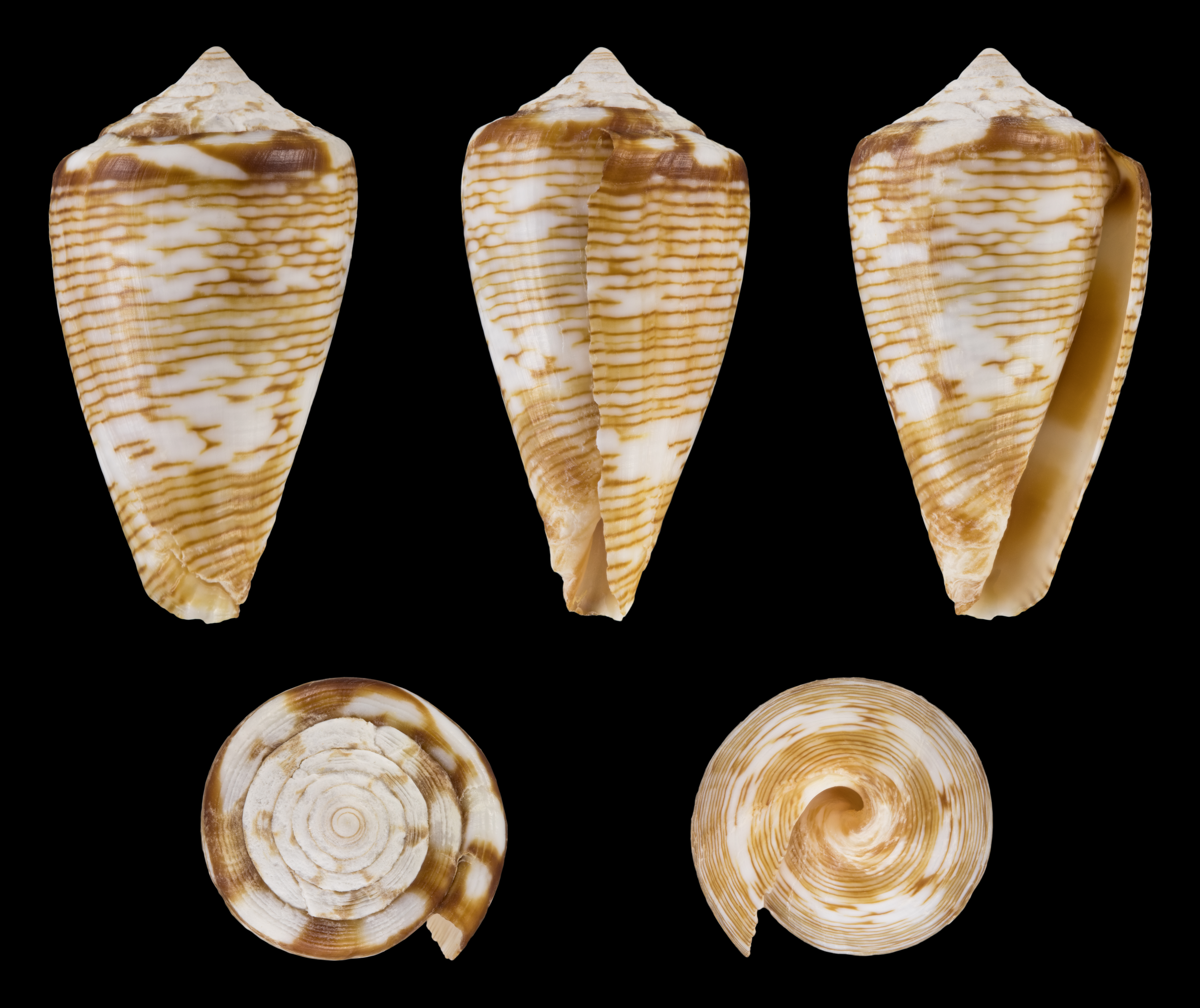
- Five views of shell of Conus crotchii Reeve, L.A., 1849

Conservation status
- Endangered (IUCN 3.1)

Scientific classification
- Kingdom: Animalia
- Phylum: Mollusca
- Class: Gastropoda
- Subclass: Caenogastropoda
- Order: Neogastropoda
- Superfamily: Conoidea
- Family: Conidae
- Genus: Conus
- Species: C. crotchii

Binomial name
- Conus crotchii Reeve, 1849

Synonyms
- Africonus antonioi Cossignani, 2014; Africonus cabraloi Cossignani, 2014; Africonus calhetinensis Cossignani & Fiadeiro, 2014; Africonus condei Afonso & Tenorio, 2014; Africonus crotchii (Reeve, 1849); Africonus docensis Cossignani & Fiadeiro, 2014; Africonus evorai (Monteiro, C. Fernandes & Rolán, 1995); Africonus fiadeiroi Tenorio, Afonso, Cunha & Rolán, 2014; Africonus irregularis (G. B. Sowerby II, 1858); Africonus josegeraldoi Cossignani & Fiadeiro, 2018; Africonus salreiensis (Rolán, 1980); Africonus teodorae (Rolán & F. Fernandes, 1990); Conus (Lautoconus) antonioi (Cossignani, 2014); Conus (Lautoconus) cabraloi (Cossignani, 2014); Conus (Lautoconus) condei (Afonso & Tenorio, 2014); Conus (Lautoconus) crotchii Reeve, 1849; Conus (Lautoconus) docensis (Cossignani & Fiadeiro, 2014); Conus (Lautoconus) evorai Monteiro, C. Fernandes & Rolán, 1995; Conus (Lautoconus) fiadeiroi (Tenorio, Afonso, Cunha & Rolán, 2014); Conus (Lautoconus) irregularis G. B. Sowerby II, 1858; Conus (Lautoconus) salreiensis Rolán, 1980; Conus (Lautoconus) teodorae Rolán & F. Fernandes, 1990; Conus cabraloi (Cossignani, 2014); Conus calhetinensis (Cossignani & Fiadeiro, 2014); Conus condei (Afonso & Tenorio, 2014); Conus docensis (Cossignani & Fiadeiro, 2014); Conus evorai Monteiro, Fernandes & Rolán, 1995; Conus fiadeiroi (Tenorio, Afonso, Cunha & Rolán, 2014); Conus iberogermanicus Röckel, Rolán & Monteiro, 1980; Conus irregularis G. B. Sowerby II, 1858; Conus josegeraldoi (Cossignani & Fiadeiro, 2018); Conus poppei Elsen, 1983; Conus salreiensis Rolán, 1980; Conus teodorae Rolán & Fernandes, 1990

= Conus crotchii =

Species of sea snail

Conus crotchii, common name Crotch's cone, is a species of sea snail, a marine gastropod mollusk in the family Conidae, the cone snails and their allies.

Like all species within the genus Conus, these snails are predatory and venomous. They are capable of stinging humans, therefore live ones should be handled carefully or not at all.

Subspecies

- Conus crotchii crotchii Reeve, 1849
- Conus crotchii josegeraldoi (T. Cossignani & Fiadeiro, 2018)

== Description ==
The size of the shell varies between 18 mm and 32 mm. The shell exhibits a somewhat abbreviately conical shape and is relatively solid. The surface is smooth, although striated at the base, and the spire displays a somewhat flatly convex profile with striate grooves. The shell exhibits a white coloration, densely encircled by fine, thread-like burnt-brown lines. Occasional snow-white spots interrupt this pattern. The spire is characterized by brown spots along the edge of the body whorl.

== Distribution ==
This species occurs in the Atlantic Ocean off the island of Boa Vista, Cape Verde.
