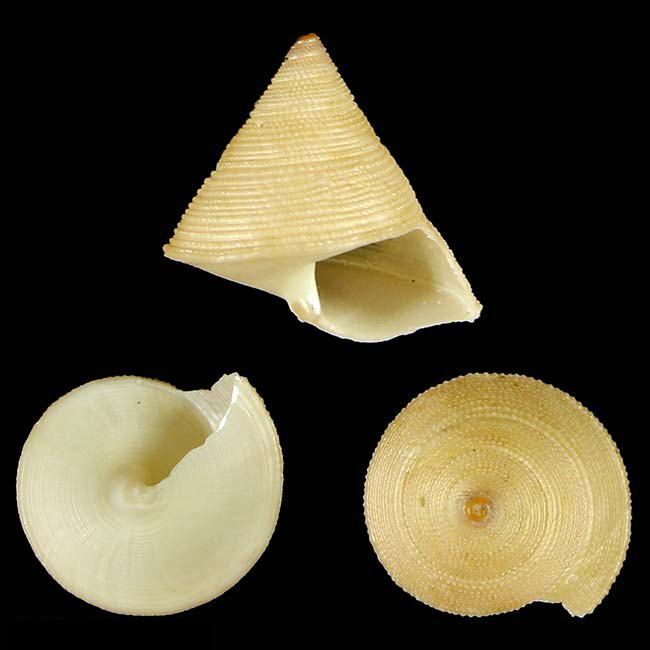

Scientific classification
- Kingdom: Animalia
- Phylum: Mollusca
- Class: Gastropoda
- Subclass: Vetigastropoda
- Order: Trochida
- Family: Calliostomatidae
- Genus: Calliostoma
- Species: C. connyae

Binomial name
- Calliostoma connyae Poppe, Tagaro & Vilvens, 2014

= Calliostoma connyae =

Species of gastropod

Calliostoma connyae is a species of sea snail, a marine gastropod mollusk in the family Calliostomatidae.

== Original description ==
- Poppe G.T., Tagaro S.P. & Vilvens C. (2014) Three new Calliostoma from the Philippines. Visaya 4(2): 49–56. [May 2014] page(s): 51.
