= Conus wandae =

Scientific classification
- Kingdom: Animalia
- Phylum: Mollusca
- Class: Gastropoda
- Subclass: Caenogastropoda
- Order: Neogastropoda
- Superfamily: Conoidea
- Family: Conidae
- Genus: Conus
- Species: C. wandae

Binomial name
- Conus wandae (Cossignani, 2014)

Synonyms
- Africonus wandae Cossignani, 2014 (original combination); Conus (Lautoconus) wandae (Cossignani, 2014) · accepted, alternate representation

Species of sea snail

Conus wandae is a species of sea snail, a marine gastropod mollusc in the family Conidae, the cone snails, cone shells or cones.

These snails are predatory and venomous. They are capable of stinging humans.

== Description ==
The size of the shell varies between 20 mm and 33 mm. It is the morphotype of Africonus borgesi var. ervatao Tenorio, M.J., C.M.L. Afonso, R.L. Cunha & E.M. Rolán, 2014.

== Distribution ==
This marine species occurs in the Atlantic Ocean off Boa Vista Island, Cape Verde.
