= Calliostoma escondidum =

Scientific classification
- Kingdom: Animalia
- Phylum: Mollusca
- Class: Gastropoda
- Subclass: Vetigastropoda
- Order: Trochida
- Superfamily: Trochoidea
- Family: Calliostomatidae
- Subfamily: Calliostomatinae
- Genus: Calliostoma
- Species: C. escondidum

Binomial name
- Calliostoma escondidum Poppe, Tagaro & Vilvens, 2014

Synonyms
- Calliostoma escondida Poppe, Tagaro & Vilvens, 2014

Species of gastropod

Calliostoma escondidum is a species of sea snail, a marine gastropod mollusk, in the family Calliostomatidae within the superfamily Trochoidea, the top snails, turban snails and their allies.

C. escondidum was originally described as Calliostoma escondida, using an incorrect gender of specific epithet.
