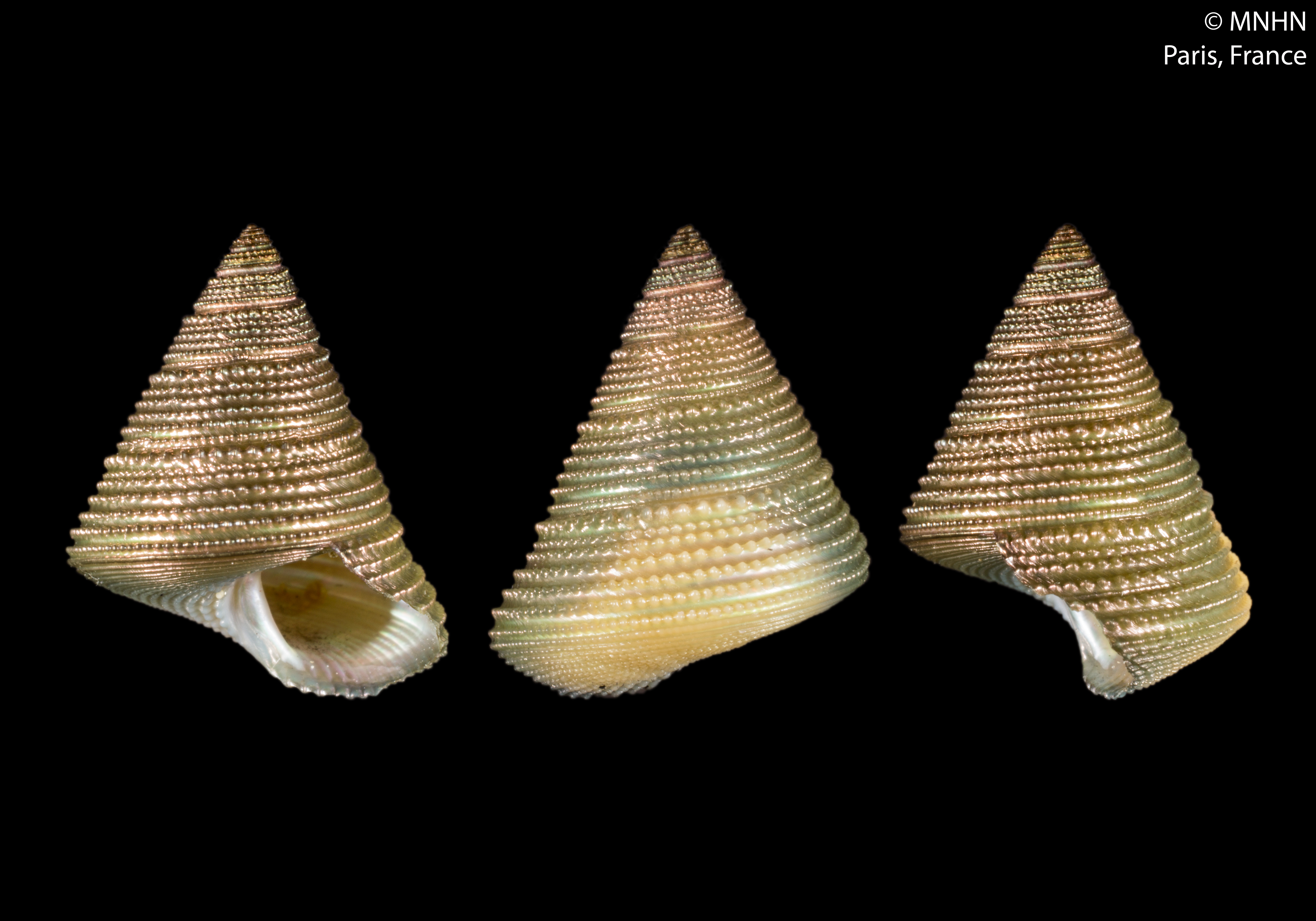
- Shell of Fautor boucheti

Scientific classification
- Kingdom: Animalia
- Phylum: Mollusca
- Class: Gastropoda
- Subclass: Vetigastropoda
- Order: Trochida
- Family: Calliostomatidae
- Genus: Fautor; Iredale, 1924

Type species
- Ziziphinus comptus A. Adams, 1855

Synonyms
- Calliostoma (Fautor) Iredale, 1924

= Fautor =

Genus of gastropods

Fautor is a genus of sea snails, marine gastropod mollusks, in the subfamily Calliostomatinae ( of the family Calliostomatidae.

== Species ==
Species within the genus Fautor include:

- Fautor boucheti (B. A. Marshall, 1995)
- Fautor chesterfieldensis (B. A. Marshall, 1995)
- Fautor chinglini S.-I Huang & I-F. Fu, 2022
- Fautor comptus (A. Adams, 1855)
- Fautor consobrinus Powell, 1958
- Fautor excultus Iredale, 1931
- Fautor houbricki (B. A. Marshall, 1995)
- Fautor lepton (Vilvens, 2012)
- Fautor manesol (S.-I Huang & I-F. Fu, 2015)
- † Fautor marwicki (Finlay, 1923)
- Fautor metivieri (B. A. Marshall, 1995)
- Fautor monikae (Stratmann & Schwabe, 2007)
- Fautor necopinatus (B. A. Marshall, 1995)
- Fautor paradigmatus (B. A. Marshall, 1995)
- Fautor periglyptus (B. A. Marshall, 1995)
- Fautor richeri (B. A. Marshall, 1995)
- † Fautor temporemutatus (Finlay, 1924)
- Fautor vaubani (B. A. Marshall, 1995)

The following species were brought into synonymy:

- Fautor cheni Dong, 2002: synonym of Calliostoma cheni (Dong, 2002)
- Fautor kurodai Azuma, 1975: synonym of Calliostoma kurodai (Azuma, 1975)
- Fautor legrandi (Tenison Woods, 1876): synonym of Calliostoma legrandi (Tenison Woods, 1876)
- Fautor opalinus Kuroda & Habe, 1971: synonym of Calliostoma opalinum (Kuroda & Habe, 1971) (original combination)
- Fautor poupineli (Montrouzier, 1875): synonym of Dactylastele poupineli (Montrouzier, 1875)
- Fautor sagamiensis Ishida & Uchida, 1977: synonym of Calliostoma sagamiense (Ishida & Uchida, 1977)
