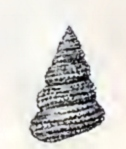
- Drawing of a shell of Dactylastele duplicata

Scientific classification
- Kingdom: Animalia
- Phylum: Mollusca
- Class: Gastropoda
- Subclass: Vetigastropoda
- Order: Trochida
- Family: Calliostomatidae
- Genus: Dactylastele
- Species: D. duplicata

Binomial name
- Dactylastele duplicata (A. Adams, 1851)

Synonyms
- Calliostoma duplicatum A. Adams, 1851; Dactylastele duplicatumA. Adams, 1851; Zizyphinus duplicatus A. Adams, 1851

= Dactylastele duplicata =

Species of gastropod

Dactylastele duplicata is a species of sea snail, a marine gastropod mollusk in the family Calliostomatidae.

== Description ==
The turreted-conic shell is imperforate. The whorls are convex. They are ornamented with granose cinguli, with two larger more prominent cinguli at the base of the shell. The interstices are longitudinally striate. A body whorl is subrounded, its base a little convex. It is sculptured with granose cinguli. The aperture is subrotund. The lip is lirate within. The columella terminates in a tubercle at its base.

== Distribution ==
This marine species occurs off Western Australia, Queensland and New South Wales.
