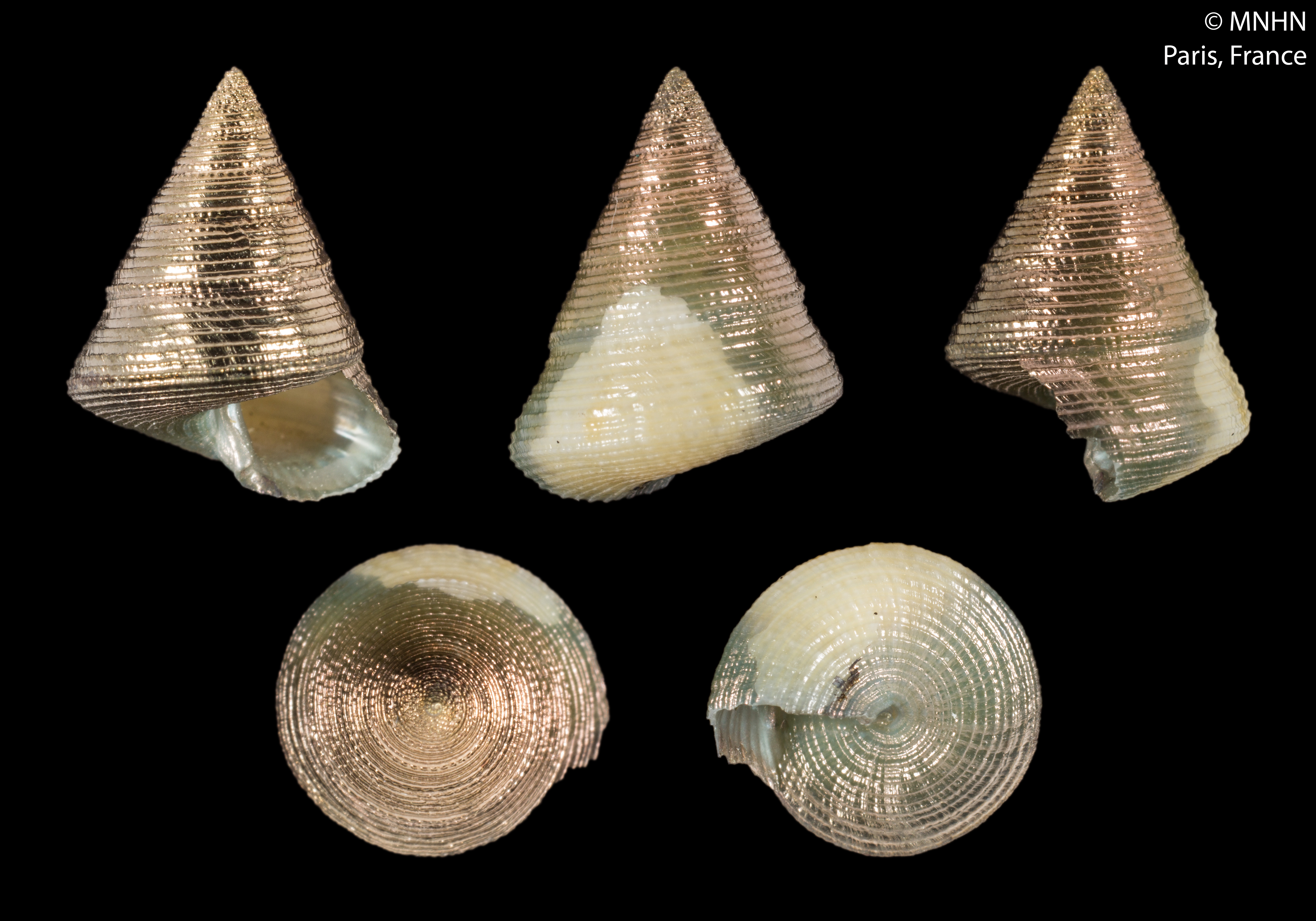
- Shell of Fautor richeri (holotype at MNHN, Paris)

Scientific classification
- Kingdom: Animalia
- Phylum: Mollusca
- Class: Gastropoda
- Subclass: Vetigastropoda
- Order: Trochida
- Family: Calliostomatidae
- Genus: Fautor
- Species: F. richeri

Binomial name
- Fautor richeri (B. A. Marshall, 1995)

Synonyms
- Calliostoma (Fautor) richeri B. A. Marshall, 1995; Calliostoma richeri B. A. Marshall, 1995

= Fautor richeri =

Species of sea snail

Fautor richeri is a species of sea snail, a marine gastropod mollusk, in the family Calliostomatidae within the superfamily Trochoidea, the top snails, turban snails and their allies.

== Description ==
The length of the shell attains 12.3 mm.

== Distribution ==
This marine species occurs off New Caledonia.
