= Fautor consobrinus =

Conservation status
- Naturally Uncommon (NZ TCS)

Scientific classification
- Kingdom: Animalia
- Phylum: Mollusca
- Class: Gastropoda
- Subclass: Vetigastropoda
- Order: Trochida
- Family: Calliostomatidae
- Genus: Fautor
- Species: F. consobrinus

Binomial name
- Fautor consobrinus Powell, 1958

Synonyms
- Calliostoma (Fautor) consobrinum (Powell, 1958); Calliostoma consobrinum (Powell, 1958)

Species of gastropod

Fautor consobrinus is a species of sea snail, a marine gastropod mollusc in the family Calliostomatidae.

== Distribution and habitat ==
This marine species occurs off the Kermadec Islands, New Zealand, at depths of about 80 m.
