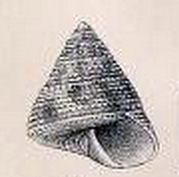
- Original drawing of a shell of Dactylastele burnupi

Scientific classification
- Kingdom: Animalia
- Phylum: Mollusca
- Class: Gastropoda
- Subclass: Vetigastropoda
- Order: Trochida
- Family: Calliostomatidae
- Subfamily: Calliostomatinae
- Genus: Dactylastele
- Species: D. burnupi

Binomial name
- Dactylastele burnupi (E.A. Smith, 1899)

Synonyms
- Calliostoma (Calliostoma) burnupi E. A. Smith, 1899; Calliostoma burnupi E.A. Smith, 1899 (original combination); Cantharidus bisculptus E. A. Smith; Calliostoma bisculptum E.A. Smith

= Dactylastele burnupi =

Species of gastropod

Dactylastele burnupi is a species of sea snail, a marine gastropod mollusk in the family Calliostomatidae.

== Description ==
The height of the imperforate, conical shell attains 14 mm. The shell contains eight, flat whorls with deep sutures. The shell is prettily granulated, the granules upon the base being less pronounced than those above. The thread-like interstices are brown. The oblique aperture is subquadrate. The general color of the shell is a fleshy tint, varied at intervals with brown blotches which are often pale bordered on the left or anterior side. The lowermost row of granules is smaller than those above. This gives the whorls a channeled appearance at the suture.

(Description of Cantharidus bisculptus) The height of the shell attains 10 mm, its diameter 8 mm. The shell has an acute conical shape. It is angulate. The 15 spirals above the angle are much finer than those upon the base. The colour may be variable but in the original greyish white example examined, the brown stripes are divided down the middle by a whitish line. They are slightly undulating and the basal lirae are spotted with the same blackish brown colour. The seven whorls are not quite flat as the rounded keel, which passes above the suture, causes a faint swelling at the lower part. The aperture is subquadrate. The lip is sharp and slightly thickened on the inside. The white columella is slightly arcuate and reflexed. The slight umbilical perforation is sometimes covered by the reflexed columella.

== Distribution ==
This marine species occurs in the Indian Ocean off Mozambique and off Durban, KwaZuluNatal, South Africa.
