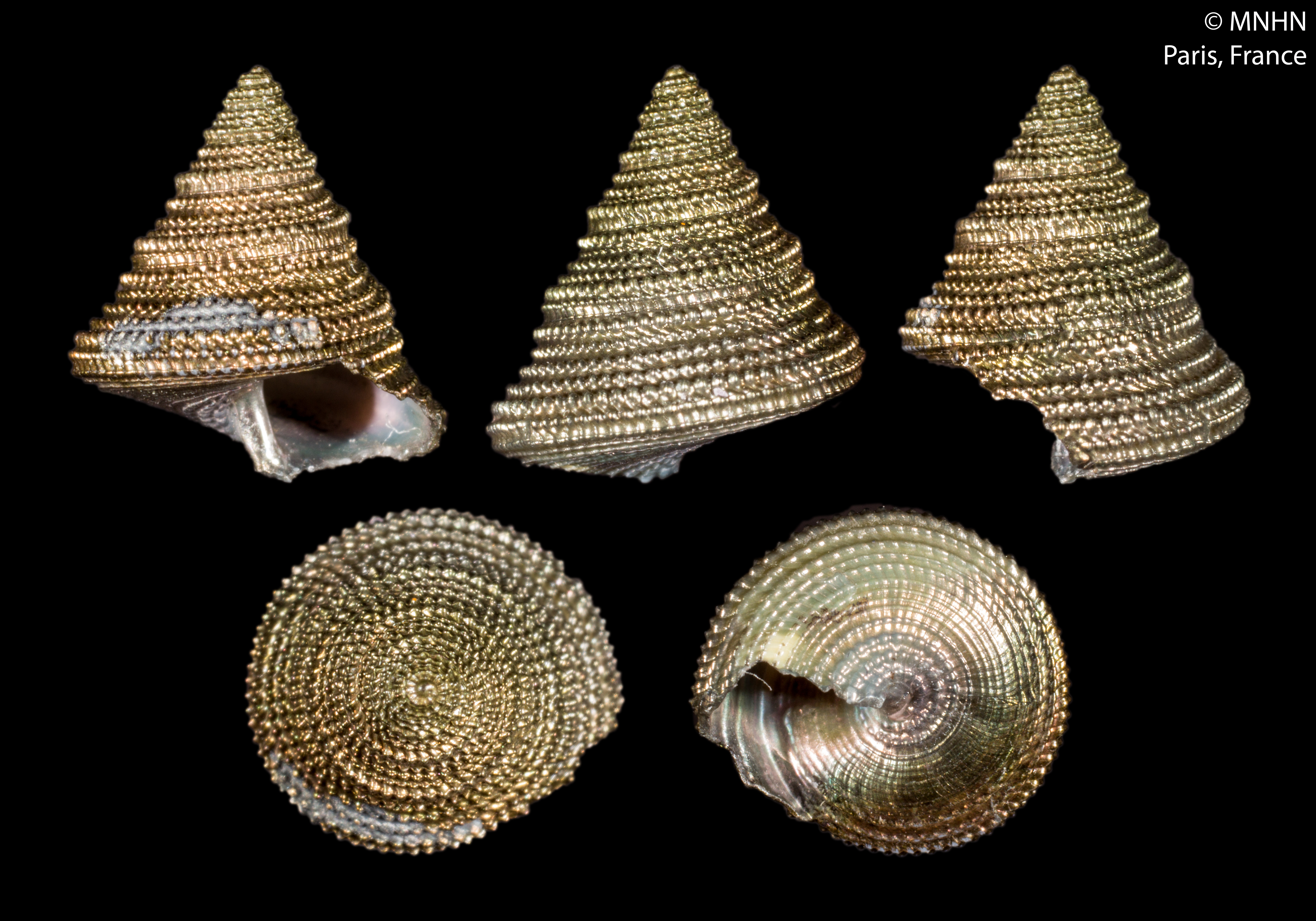
- Shell of Fautor vaubani (holotype at MNHN, Paris)

Scientific classification
- Kingdom: Animalia
- Phylum: Mollusca
- Class: Gastropoda
- Subclass: Vetigastropoda
- Order: Trochida
- Family: Calliostomatidae
- Genus: Fautor
- Species: F. vaubani

Binomial name
- Fautor vaubani (B. A. Marshall, 1995)

Synonyms
- Calliostoma (Fautor) vaubani B. A. Marshall, 1995; Calliostoma vaubani B. A. Marshall, 1995

= Fautor vaubani =

Species of gastropod

Fautor vaubani is a species of sea snail, a marine gastropod mollusk, in the family Calliostomatidae within the superfamily Trochoidea, the top snails, turban snails and their allies.

== Description ==
The length of the shell attains 7.6 mm.

== Distribution ==
This marine species occurs off New Caledonia and the Loyalty Islands.
