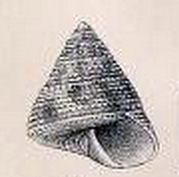
- Dactylastele burnupi

Scientific classification
- Kingdom: Animalia
- Phylum: Mollusca
- Class: Gastropoda
- Subclass: Vetigastropoda
- Order: Trochida
- Superfamily: Trochoidea
- Family: Calliostomatidae
- Subfamily: Calliostomatinae
- Genus: Dactylastele; Marshall, 1995

Type species
- Trochus (Zizyphinus) poupineli Montrouzier, 1875

= Dactylastele =

Genus of gastropods

Dactylastele is a genus of sea snails, marine gastropod mollusks in the family Calliostomatidae.

== Species ==
Species within the genus Dactylastele include:

- Dactylastele burnupi (E.A. Smith, 1899)
- Dactylastele duplicata (A. Adams, 1851)
- Dactylastele nevilli (Sowerby, 1905)
- Dactylastele poupineli (Montrouzier in Souverbie & Montrouzier, 1875):
