= Fautor comptus =

Scientific classification
- Kingdom: Animalia
- Phylum: Mollusca
- Class: Gastropoda
- Subclass: Vetigastropoda
- Order: Trochida
- Family: Calliostomatidae
- Genus: Fautor
- Species: F. comptus

Binomial name
- Fautor comptus (A. Adams, 1855)

Synonyms
- Calliostoma (Fautor) comptum (A. Adams, 1855); Calliostoma adamsi Brazier, 1895; Calliostoma comptum (A. Adams, 1855); Calliostoma purpureocinctum Hedley, 1894; Ziziphinus comptus A. Adams, 1855

Species of gastropod

Fautor comptus is a species of sea snail, a marine gastropod mollusk, in the family Calliostomatidae within the superfamily Trochoidea, the top snails, turban snails and their allies.
