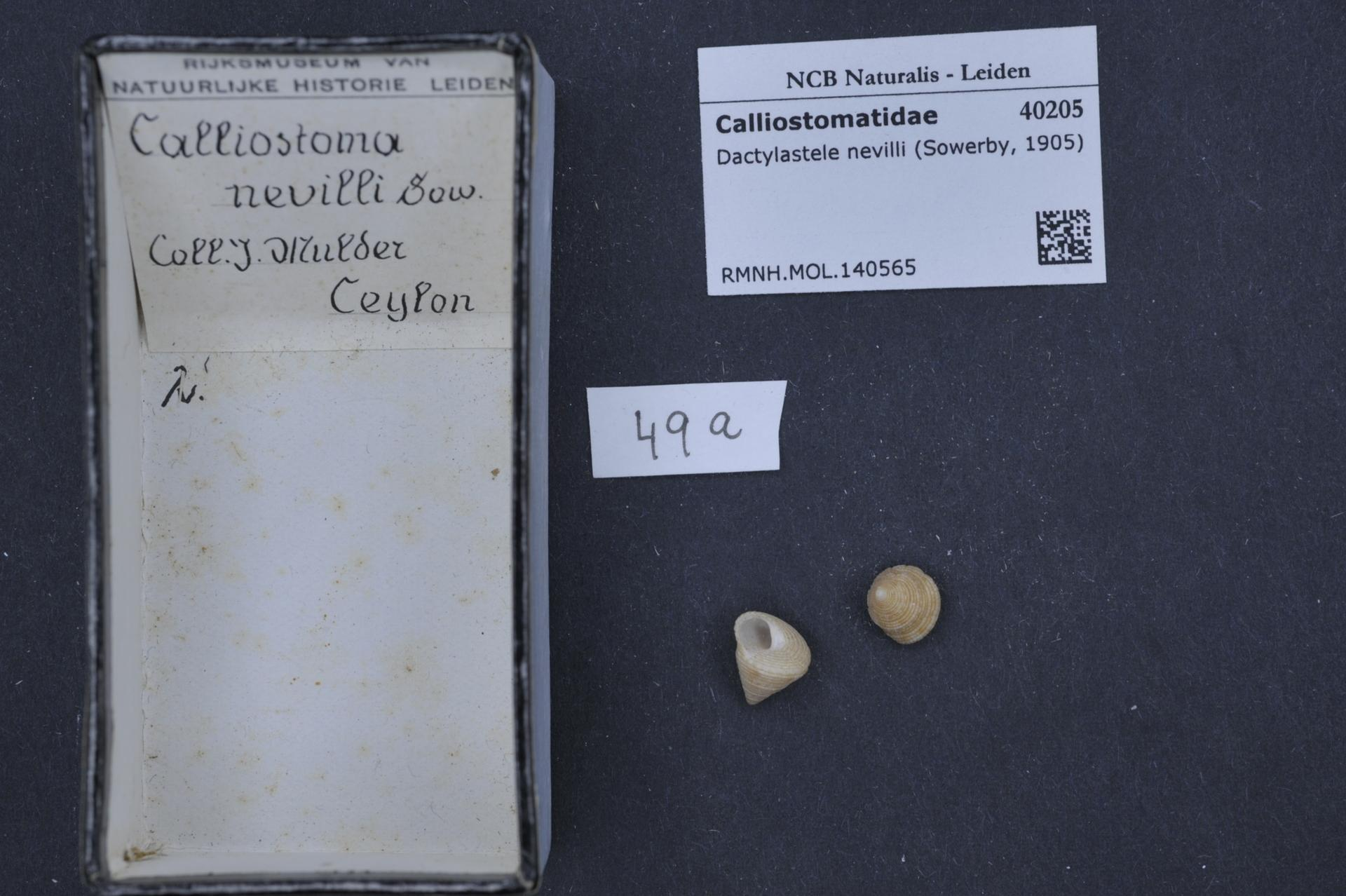

Scientific classification
- Kingdom: Animalia
- Phylum: Mollusca
- Class: Gastropoda
- Subclass: Vetigastropoda
- Order: Trochida
- Family: Calliostomatidae
- Genus: Dactylastele
- Species: D. nevilli

Binomial name
- Dactylastele nevilli (Sowerby III, 1905)

Synonyms
- Calliostoma nevilli Sowerby III, 1905

= Dactylastele nevilli =

Species of gastropod

Dactylastele nevilli is a species of sea snail, a marine gastropod mollusc in the family Calliostomatidae.

== Notes ==
- Petit R.E. (2009) George Brettingham Sowerby, I, II & III: their conchological publications and molluscan taxa. Zootaxa 2189: 1–218
