= Fautor monikae =

Scientific classification
- Kingdom: Animalia
- Phylum: Mollusca
- Class: Gastropoda
- Subclass: Vetigastropoda
- Order: Trochida
- Family: Calliostomatidae
- Genus: Fautor
- Species: F. monikae

Binomial name
- Fautor monikae (Stratmann & Schwabe, 2007)

Species of gastropod

Fautor monikae is a species of sea snail, a marine gastropod mollusk in the family Calliostomatidae.

== Distribution ==
This species occurs in the Pacific Ocean off the Samoan Islands.
