= Fautor temporemutatus =

Scientific classification
- Kingdom: Animalia
- Phylum: Mollusca
- Class: Gastropoda
- Subclass: Vetigastropoda
- Order: Trochida
- Family: Calliostomatidae
- Genus: Fautor
- Species: †F. temporemutatus

Binomial name
- †Fautor temporemutatus (Finlay, 1924)

Synonyms
- Calliostoma (Fautor) temporemutatus Finlay, 1924; Calliostoma cancellatum Finlay, 1923; Calliostoma temporemutatus Finlay, 1924

Extinct species of gastropod

Fautor temporemutatus is an extinct species of sea snail, a marine gastropod mollusk, in the family Calliostomatidae within the superfamily Trochoidea, the top snails, turban snails and their allies.
