= Fautor marwicki =

Scientific classification
- Kingdom: Animalia
- Phylum: Mollusca
- Class: Gastropoda
- Subclass: Vetigastropoda
- Order: Trochida
- Family: Calliostomatidae
- Genus: Fautor
- Species: †F. marwicki

Binomial name
- †Fautor marwicki (Finlay, 1923)

Synonyms
- Calliostoma (Fautor) marwicki Finlay, 1923; Calliostoma marwicki Finlay, 1923

Extinct species of gastropod

Fautor marwicki is an extinct species of sea snail, a marine gastropod mollusk, in the family Calliostomatidae within the superfamily Trochoidea, the top snails, turban snails and their allies.
