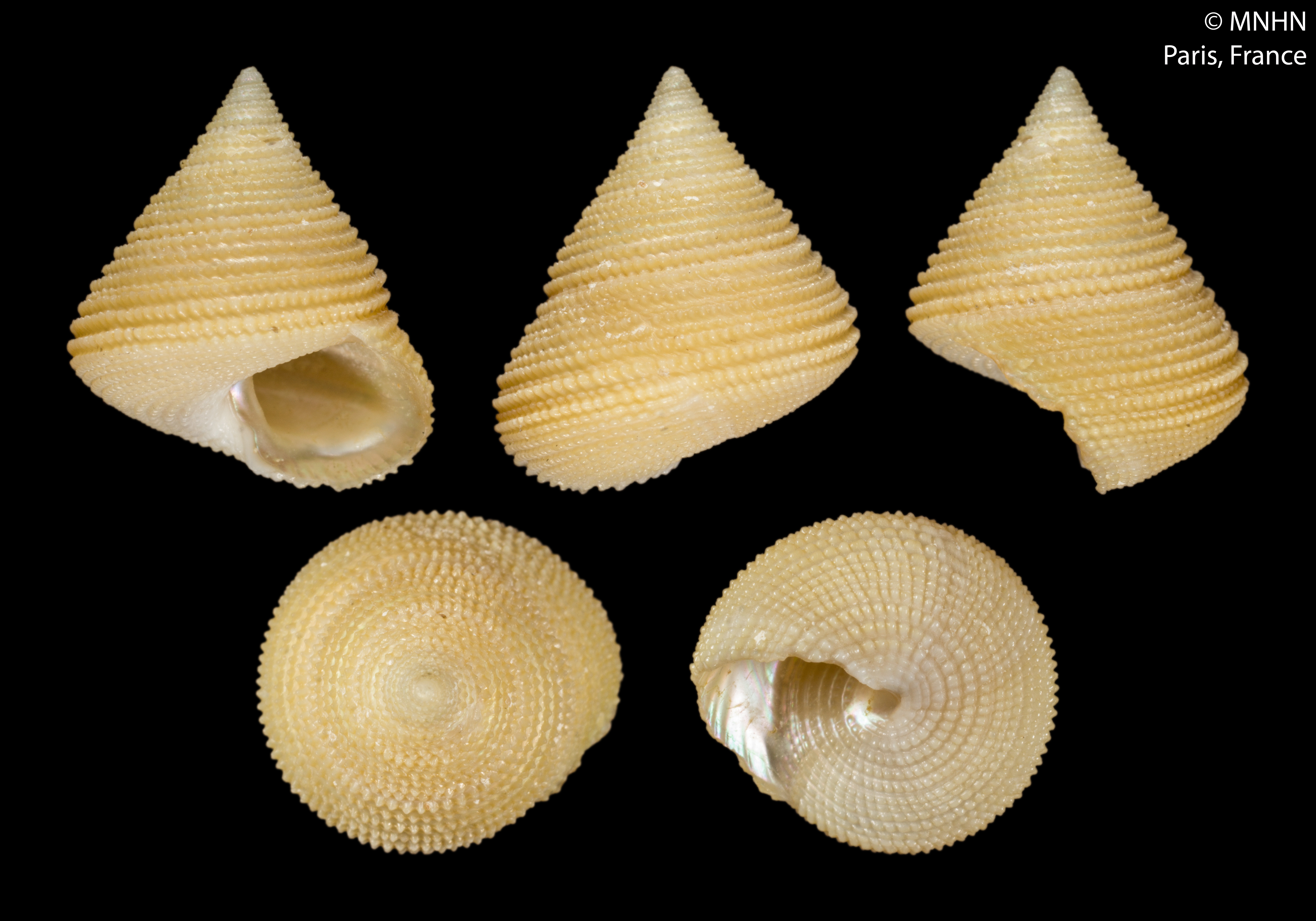
- Shell of Fautor lepton (holotype at MNHN, Paris)

Scientific classification
- Kingdom: Animalia
- Phylum: Mollusca
- Class: Gastropoda
- Subclass: Vetigastropoda
- Order: Trochida
- Family: Calliostomatidae
- Genus: Fautor
- Species: F. lepton

Binomial name
- Fautor lepton (Vilvens, 2012)

Synonyms
- Calliostoma (Fautor) lepton Vilvens, 2012; Calliostoma lepton Vilvens, 2012

= Fautor lepton =

Species of gastropod

Fautor lepton is a species of sea snail, a marine gastropod mollusk, in the family Calliostomatidae within the superfamily Trochoidea, the top snails, turban snails and their allies.

== Description ==
The length of this cone-shaped shell attains 12.6 mm.

== Distribution ==
This marine species of mollusk occurs off the Tuamotu Archipelago in French Polynesia.
