= Fautor chesterfieldensis =

Scientific classification
- Kingdom: Animalia
- Phylum: Mollusca
- Class: Gastropoda
- Subclass: Vetigastropoda
- Order: Trochida
- Family: Calliostomatidae
- Genus: Fautor
- Species: F. chesterfieldensis

Binomial name
- Fautor chesterfieldensis (B. A. Marshall, 1995)

Synonyms
- Calliostoma (Fautor) chesterfieldense B. A. Marshall, 1995; Calliostoma chesterfieldense B. A. Marshall, 1995

Species of gastropod

Fautor chesterfieldensis is a species of sea snail, a marine gastropod mollusk, in the family Calliostomatidae within the superfamily Trochoidea, the top snails, turban snails and their allies.
