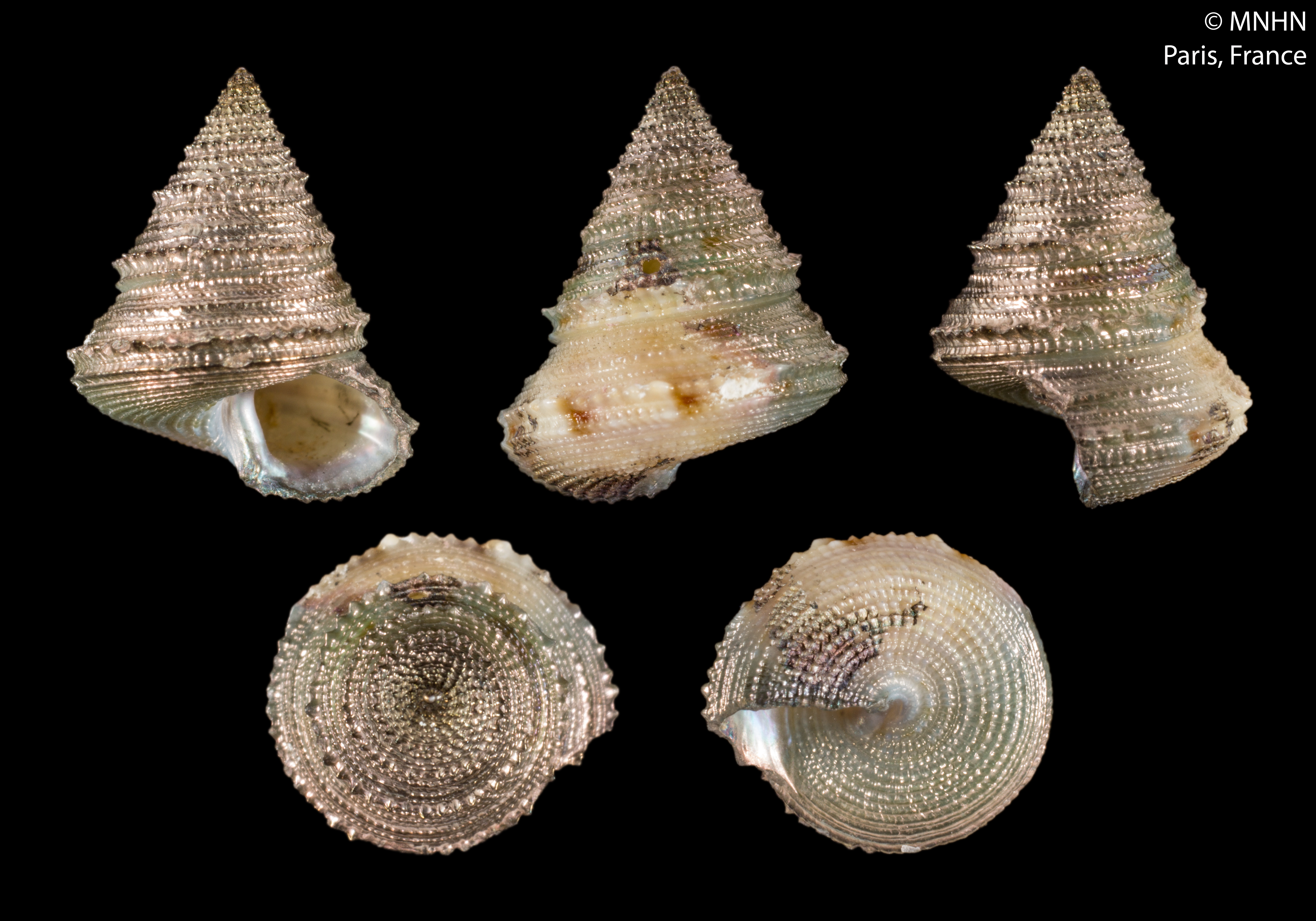
- Shell of Fautor periglyptus (specimen at MNHN, Paris)

Scientific classification
- Kingdom: Animalia
- Phylum: Mollusca
- Class: Gastropoda
- Subclass: Vetigastropoda
- Order: Trochida
- Family: Calliostomatidae
- Genus: Fautor
- Species: F. periglyptus

Binomial name
- Fautor periglyptus (B. A. Marshall, 1995)

Synonyms
- Calliostoma (Fautor) periglyptum B. A. Marshall, 1995; Calliostoma periglyptum B. A. Marshall, 1995

= Fautor periglyptus =

Species of gastropod

Fautor periglyptus is a species of sea snail, a marine gastropod mollusk, in the family Calliostomatidae within the superfamily Trochoidea, the top snails, turban snails and their allies.

== Distribution ==
This marine species occurs off New Caledonia.
