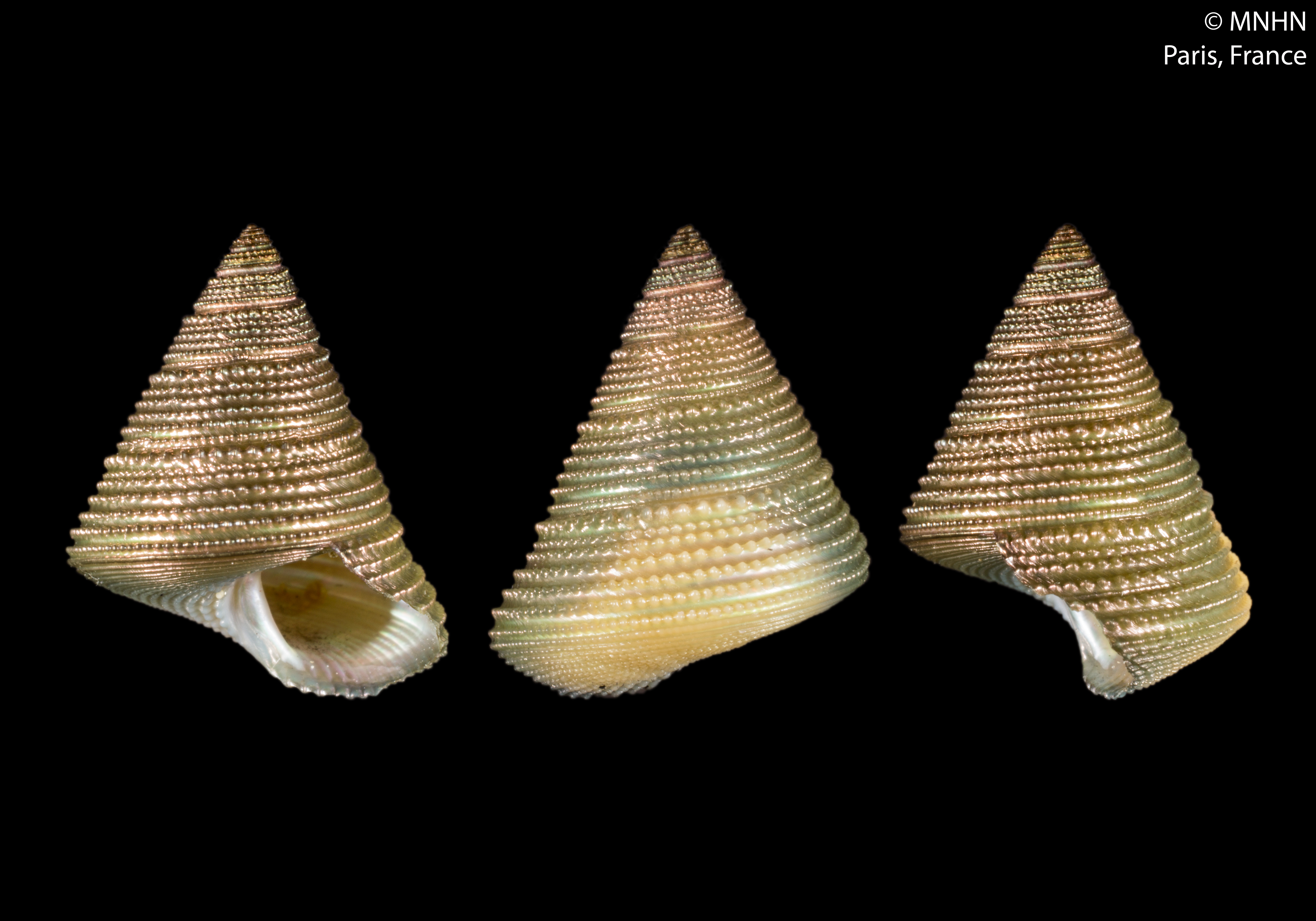
- Shells of holotype at MNHN, Paris

Scientific classification
- Kingdom: Animalia
- Phylum: Mollusca
- Class: Gastropoda
- Subclass: Vetigastropoda
- Order: Trochida
- Family: Calliostomatidae
- Genus: Fautor
- Species: F. boucheti

Binomial name
- Fautor boucheti (B. A. Marshall, 1995)

Synonyms
- Calliostoma (Fautor) boucheti B. A. Marshall, 1995; Calliostoma boucheti B. A. Marshall, 1995

= Fautor boucheti =

Species of gastropod

Fautor boucheti is a species of sea snail, a marine gastropod mollusk, in the family Calliostomatidae within the superfamily Trochoidea, the top snails, turban snails and their allies.

== Description ==
The length of the shell attains 13 mm.

== Distribution ==
This marine species occurs off New Caledonia.
