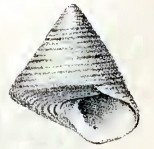
- Drawing of a shell of Calliostoma legrandi

Scientific classification
- Kingdom: Animalia
- Phylum: Mollusca
- Class: Gastropoda
- Subclass: Vetigastropoda
- Order: Trochida
- Family: Calliostomatidae
- Genus: Calliostoma
- Species: C. legrandi

Binomial name
- Calliostoma legrandi (Tenison-Woods, 1876)

Synonyms
- Calliostoma (Fautor) legrandi (Tenison-Woods, 1876); Zizyphinus legrandi Tenison-Woods, 1876

= Calliostoma legrandi =

Species of gastropod

Calliostoma legrandi is a species of small sea snail, a marine gastropod mollusk in the family Calliostomatidae, the Calliostoma top snails.

Some authors place this taxon in the subgenus Calliostoma (Fautor) .

== Description ==
The size of the shell varies between 9 mm and 14 mm. The shell has a straightly conical shape. It is imperforate, solid, and rather thick with a yellowish flesh-color. It is sculptured spirally with numerous smooth riblets, alternately larger and smaller, 8 or 9 on the penultimate whorl, about 14 on the base, some of the interstitial ones near the axis quite small, the outer ones subequal in size. The spire is conic, its outlines straight. The sutures are scarcely visible except for a slightly wider cingulus above them. The whorls number about 6. They are flat, the last angular, nearly flat beneath, shortly deflexed at the aperture. The oblique aperture is rhomboidal, with a couple of prominent riblets inside the upper lip. The basal lip is thickened. The columella is straight or a trifle projecting in the middle.

== Distribution ==
This marine species occurs off Southern Australia and Tasmania.
