= Calliostoma sagamiense =

Scientific classification
- Kingdom: Animalia
- Phylum: Mollusca
- Class: Gastropoda
- Subclass: Vetigastropoda
- Order: Trochida
- Superfamily: Trochoidea
- Family: Calliostomatidae
- Subfamily: Calliostomatinae
- Genus: Calliostoma
- Species: C. sagamiense

Binomial name
- Calliostoma sagamiense (Ishida & Uchida, 1977)

Synonyms
- Fautor sagamiensis Ishida & Uchida, 1977

Species of gastropod

Calliostoma sagamiense is a species of sea snail, a marine gastropod mollusk, in the family Calliostomatidae within the superfamily Trochoidea, the top snails, turban snails and their allies.
