= Calliostoma cheni =

Scientific classification
- Kingdom: Animalia
- Phylum: Mollusca
- Class: Gastropoda
- Subclass: Vetigastropoda
- Order: Trochida
- Family: Calliostomatidae
- Genus: Calliostoma
- Species: C. cheni

Binomial name
- Calliostoma cheni (Dong, 2002)

Synonyms
- Fautor cheni Dong, 2002

Species of gastropod

Calliostoma cheni is a species of sea snail, a marine gastropod mollusk in the family Calliostomatidae.

Some authors place this taxon in the subgenus Calliostoma (Fautor)
