= Calliostoma kurodai =

Scientific classification
- Kingdom: Animalia
- Phylum: Mollusca
- Class: Gastropoda
- Subclass: Vetigastropoda
- Order: Trochida
- Family: Calliostomatidae
- Genus: Calliostoma
- Species: C. kurodai

Binomial name
- Calliostoma kurodai (Azuma, 1975)

Synonyms
- Fautor kurodai Azuma, 1975

Species of gastropod

Calliostoma kurodai is a species of sea snail, a marine gastropod mollusk in the family Calliostomatidae.

Some authors place this taxon in the subgenus Calliostoma (Fautor).

== Distribution ==
This marine species occurs off Japan.
