= Calliostoma opalinum =

Scientific classification
- Kingdom: Animalia
- Phylum: Mollusca
- Class: Gastropoda
- Subclass: Vetigastropoda
- Order: Trochida
- Family: Calliostomatidae
- Genus: Calliostoma
- Species: C. opalinum

Binomial name
- Calliostoma opalinum (Kuroda & Habe in Kuroda, Habe & Oyama, 1971)

Synonyms
- Fautor opalinus Kuroda & Habe in Kuroda, Habe & Oyama, 1971

Species of gastropod

Calliostoma opalinum is a species of sea snail, a marine gastropod mollusk in the family Calliostomatidae.

Some authors place this taxon in the subgenus Calliostoma (Fautor) .

== Distribution ==
This marine species occurs off Japan.
