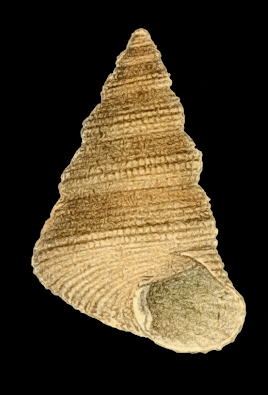
- Shell of Dactylastele poupineli

Scientific classification
- Kingdom: Animalia
- Phylum: Mollusca
- Class: Gastropoda
- Subclass: Vetigastropoda
- Order: Trochida
- Family: Calliostomatidae
- Genus: Dactylastele
- Species: D. poupineli

Binomial name
- Dactylastele poupineli (Montrouzier in Souverbie & Montrouzier, 1875)

Synonyms
- Calliostoma poupineli Thiele, 1930; Trochus (Zizyphinus) poupineli Montrouzier in Souverbie & Montrouzier, 1875; Fautor poupineli (Montrouzier, 1875); Trochus poupineli Montrouzier in Souverbie & Montrouzier, 1875

= Dactylastele poupineli =

Species of gastropod

Dactylastele poupineli is a species of sea snail, a marine gastropod mollusk in the family Calliostomatidae.

== Description ==
The length of the shell attains 12 mm, its diameter 8 mm.

(Original description in Latin) The shell is cone-shaped with mud-like or yellowish coloration, with a pointed apex. It is decorated all over with spiral cords that are close together and cut somewhat obliquely and granularly. Two of the cords above the margin are stronger. The shell is glossy and somewhat crystalline and fleshy-white, marked with yellowish dots that are somewhat spaced out and arranged on the cord above the suture.

It has 8 whorls, separated by an impressed suture. The upper part of the whorls is somewhat concave, while the lower part is slightly swollen and very bluntly keeled, with the lower face being flatly convex.

The aperture is oblique and somewhat rhomboid-shaped. The throat is glossy and pearly, and furrowed. The right margin is doubled, with the outer lip being sharp and crenulated. The columellar lip is somewhat vertical, thickened, and tuberculate (covered with small bumps).

== Distribution ==
This marine species occurs off the Philippines, Japan, Fiji, New Caledonia and Australia (Queensland)
