= Calliotropis annonaformis =

Scientific classification
- Kingdom: Animalia
- Phylum: Mollusca
- Class: Gastropoda
- Subclass: Vetigastropoda
- Family: Calliotropidae
- Genus: Calliotropis
- Species: C. annonaformis

Binomial name
- Calliotropis annonaformis Lee Y.C. & Wu W.L., 2001

Species of gastropod

Calliotropis annonaformis is a species of sea snail, a marine gastropod mollusk in the family Eucyclidae.

== Distribution ==
This marine species occurs off Taiwan.
