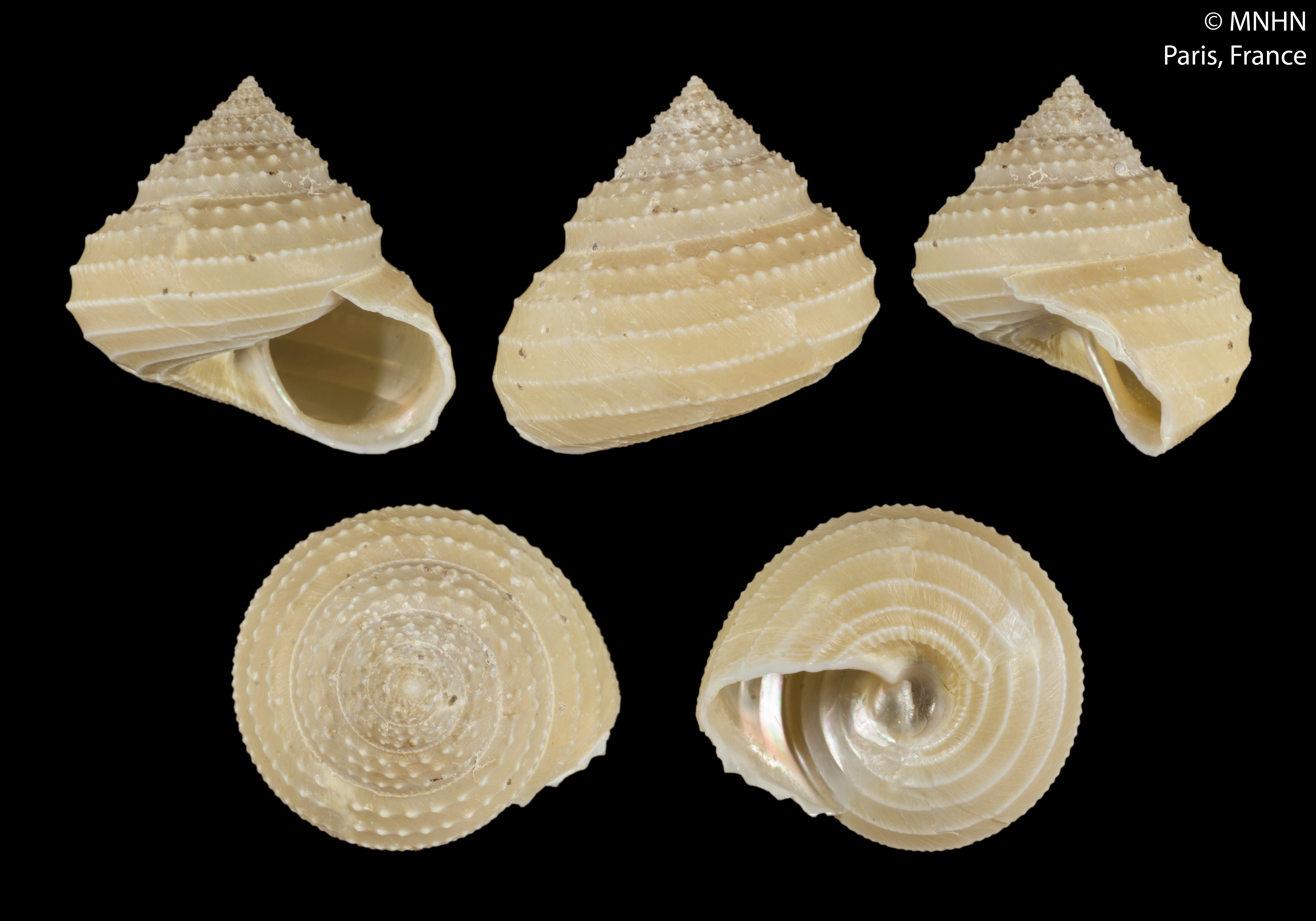
- Shell of Calliotropis ammos (holotype at MNHN, Paris)

Scientific classification
- Kingdom: Animalia
- Phylum: Mollusca
- Class: Gastropoda
- Subclass: Vetigastropoda
- Superfamily: Seguenzioidea
- Family: Calliotropidae
- Genus: Calliotropis
- Species: C. ammos

Binomial name
- Calliotropis ammos Vilvens, 2012

= Calliotropis ammos =

Species of gastropod

Calliotropis ammos is a species of sea snail, a marine gastropod mollusc in the family Eucyclidae.

== Distribution ==
This species occurs in the Pacific Ocean off Tuamotu, French Polynesia.
