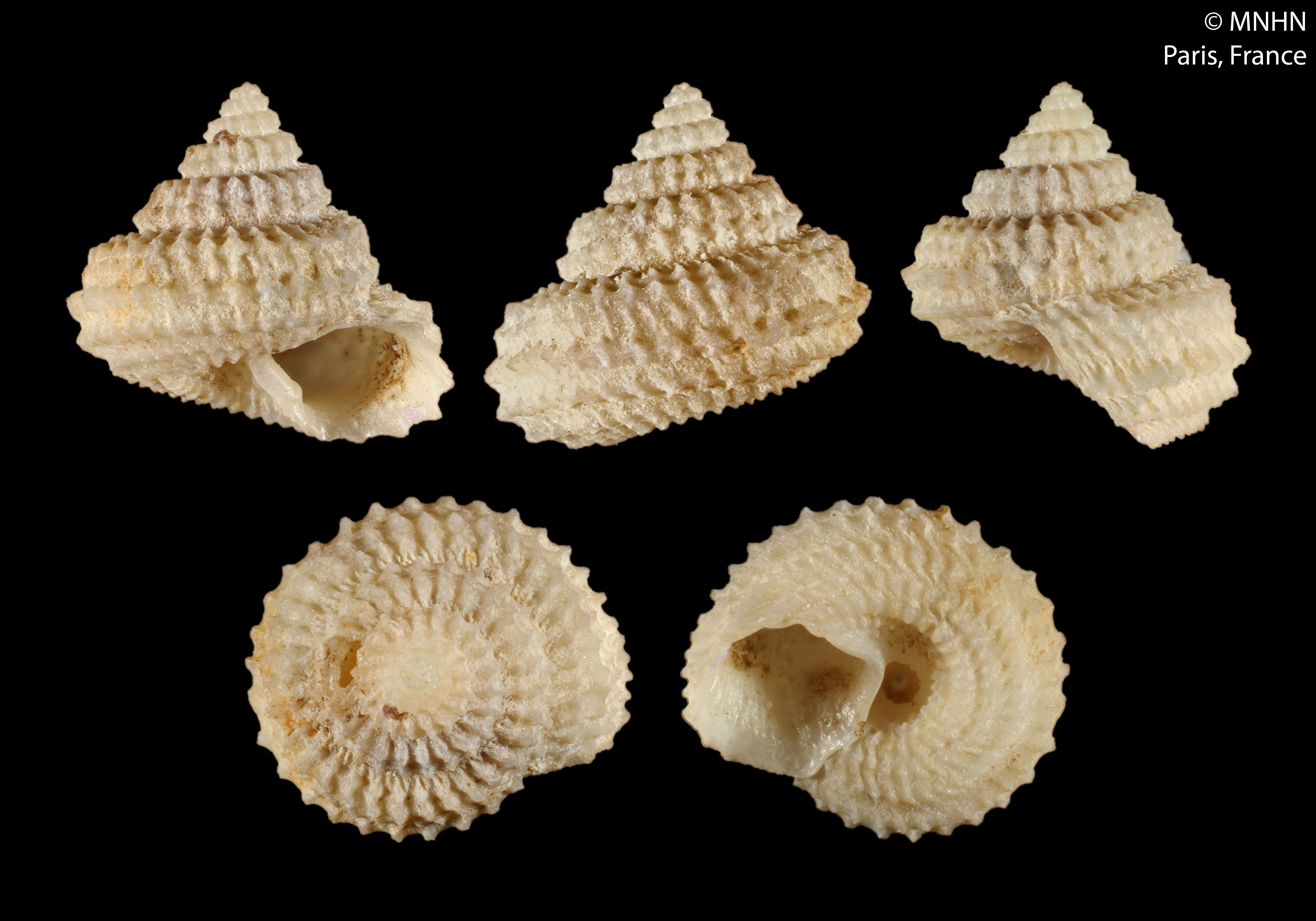

Scientific classification
- Kingdom: Animalia
- Phylum: Mollusca
- Class: Gastropoda
- Subclass: Vetigastropoda
- Family: Calliotropidae
- Genus: Calliotropis
- Species: C. echidnoides

Binomial name
- Calliotropis echidnoides Vilvens, 2007

= Calliotropis echidnoides =

Species of gastropod

Calliotropis echidnoides is a species of sea snail, a marine gastropod mollusk in the family Eucyclidae.

== Description ==
The length of the shell attains 4.7 mm.

== Distribution ==
This marine species occurs off Tonga and New Caledonia.
