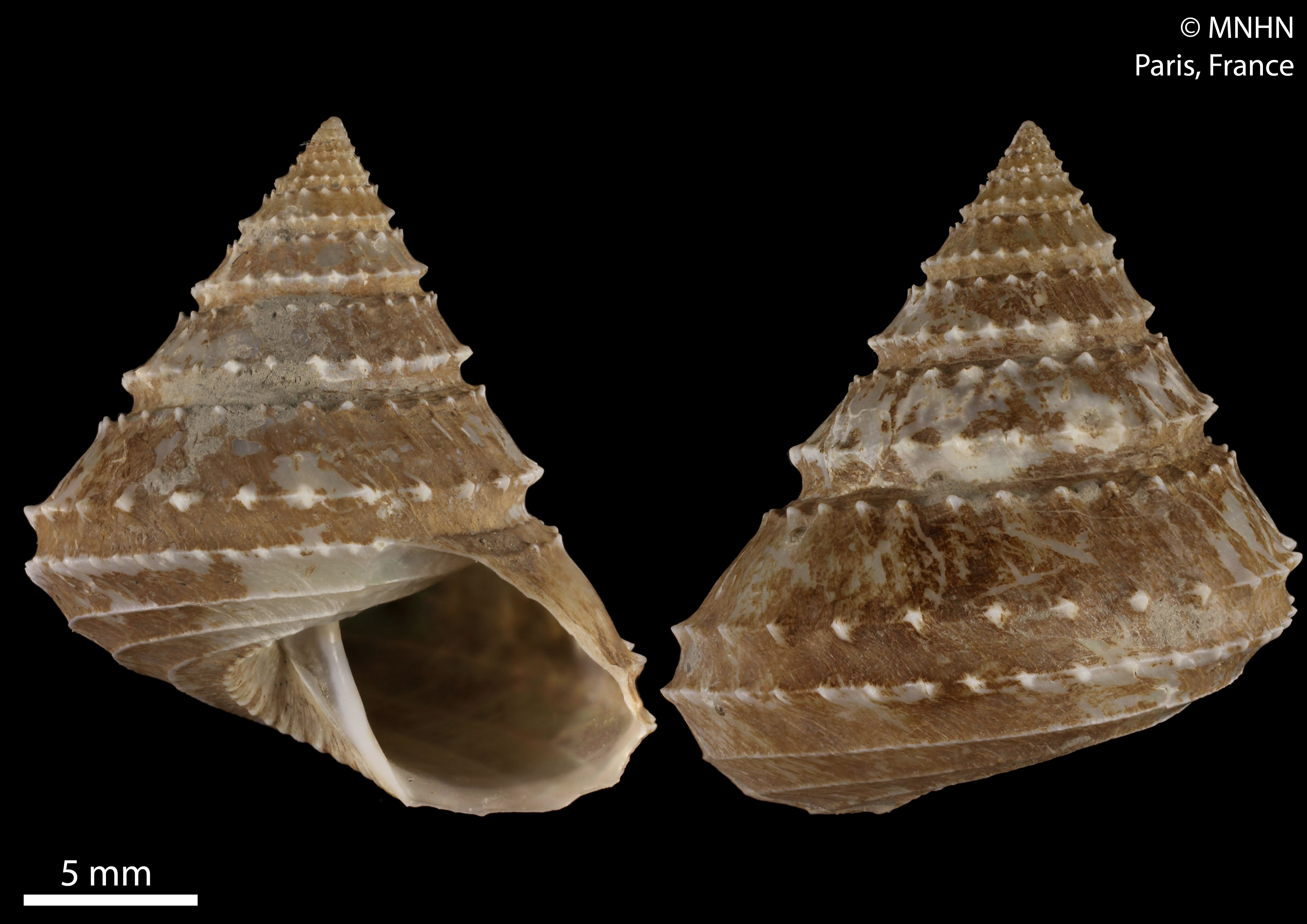
- Shell of Calliotropis helix (paratype at MNHN, Paris)

Scientific classification
- Kingdom: Animalia
- Phylum: Mollusca
- Class: Gastropoda
- Subclass: Vetigastropoda
- Family: Calliotropidae
- Genus: Calliotropis
- Species: C. helix

Binomial name
- Calliotropis helix Vilvens, 2007

= Calliotropis helix =

Species of gastropod

Calliotropis helix is a species of sea snail, a marine gastropod mollusk in the family Eucyclidae.

== Description ==
The length of the shell reaches 20 mm.

== Distribution ==
This marine species occurs off Taiwan and in the South China Sea.
