= Calliotropis carinata =

Scientific classification
- Kingdom: Animalia
- Phylum: Mollusca
- Class: Gastropoda
- Subclass: Vetigastropoda
- Family: Calliotropidae
- Genus: Calliotropis
- Species: C. carinata

Binomial name
- Calliotropis carinata Jansen, 1994

Synonyms
- Calliotropis (Calliotropis) carinata Jansen, 1994

Species of gastropod

Calliotropis carinata is a species of sea snail, a marine gastropod mollusk in the family Eucyclidae.

== Distribution ==
This marine species occurs off East Australia.
