= Calliotropis carlotta =

Scientific classification
- Kingdom: Animalia
- Phylum: Mollusca
- Class: Gastropoda
- Subclass: Vetigastropoda
- Superfamily: Seguenzioidea
- Family: Calliotropidae
- Genus: Calliotropis
- Species: C. carlotta

Binomial name
- Calliotropis carlotta (Dall, 1902)

Species of gastropod

Calliotropis carlotta is a species of sea snail, a marine gastropod mollusk in the family Eucyclidae.

== Description ==
The shell can grow to be 10 mm in length.

== Distribution ==
It can be found in Oregon and British Columbia.
