= Calliotropis globosa =

Scientific classification
- Kingdom: Animalia
- Phylum: Mollusca
- Class: Gastropoda
- Subclass: Vetigastropoda
- Superfamily: Seguenzioidea
- Family: Calliotropidae
- Genus: Calliotropis
- Species: C. globosa

Binomial name
- Calliotropis globosa Quinn, 1991

Species of gastropod

Calliotropis globosa is a species of sea snail, a marine gastropod mollusk in the family Eucyclidae.

== Description ==
The height of the shell attains 10 mm.

== Distribution ==
This marine species occurs off Mexico, Venezuela, Cuba, Guadeloupe, Jamaica, and Barbados at depths between 732 m and 1,829 m.
