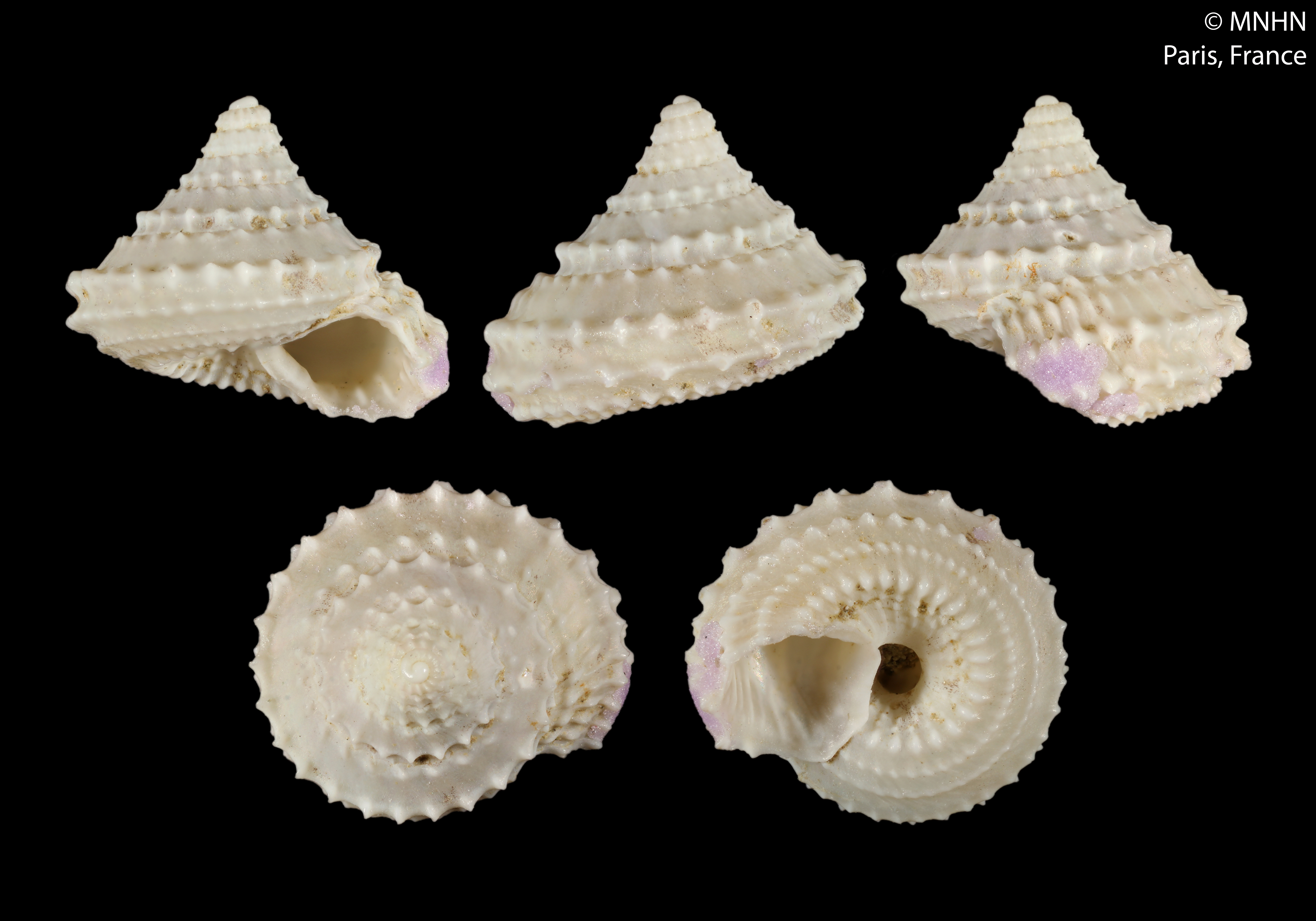

Scientific classification
- Kingdom: Animalia
- Phylum: Mollusca
- Class: Gastropoda
- Subclass: Vetigastropoda
- Family: Calliotropidae
- Genus: Calliotropis
- Species: C. coopertorium

Binomial name
- Calliotropis coopertorium Vilvens, 2007

= Calliotropis coopertorium =

Species of gastropod

Calliotropis coopertorium is a species of sea snail, a marine gastropod mollusc in the family Eucyclidae.

== Description ==
The shell can grow to be 2.8 mm in length.

== Distribution ==
Can be found in Vanuatu and Fiji.
