= Calliotropis grata =

Scientific classification
- Kingdom: Animalia
- Phylum: Mollusca
- Class: Gastropoda
- Subclass: Vetigastropoda
- Family: Calliotropidae
- Genus: Calliotropis
- Species: C. grata

Binomial name
- Calliotropis grata Thiele, 1925

Species of gastropod

Calliotropis grata is a species of sea snail, a marine gastropod mollusk in the family Eucyclidae.
