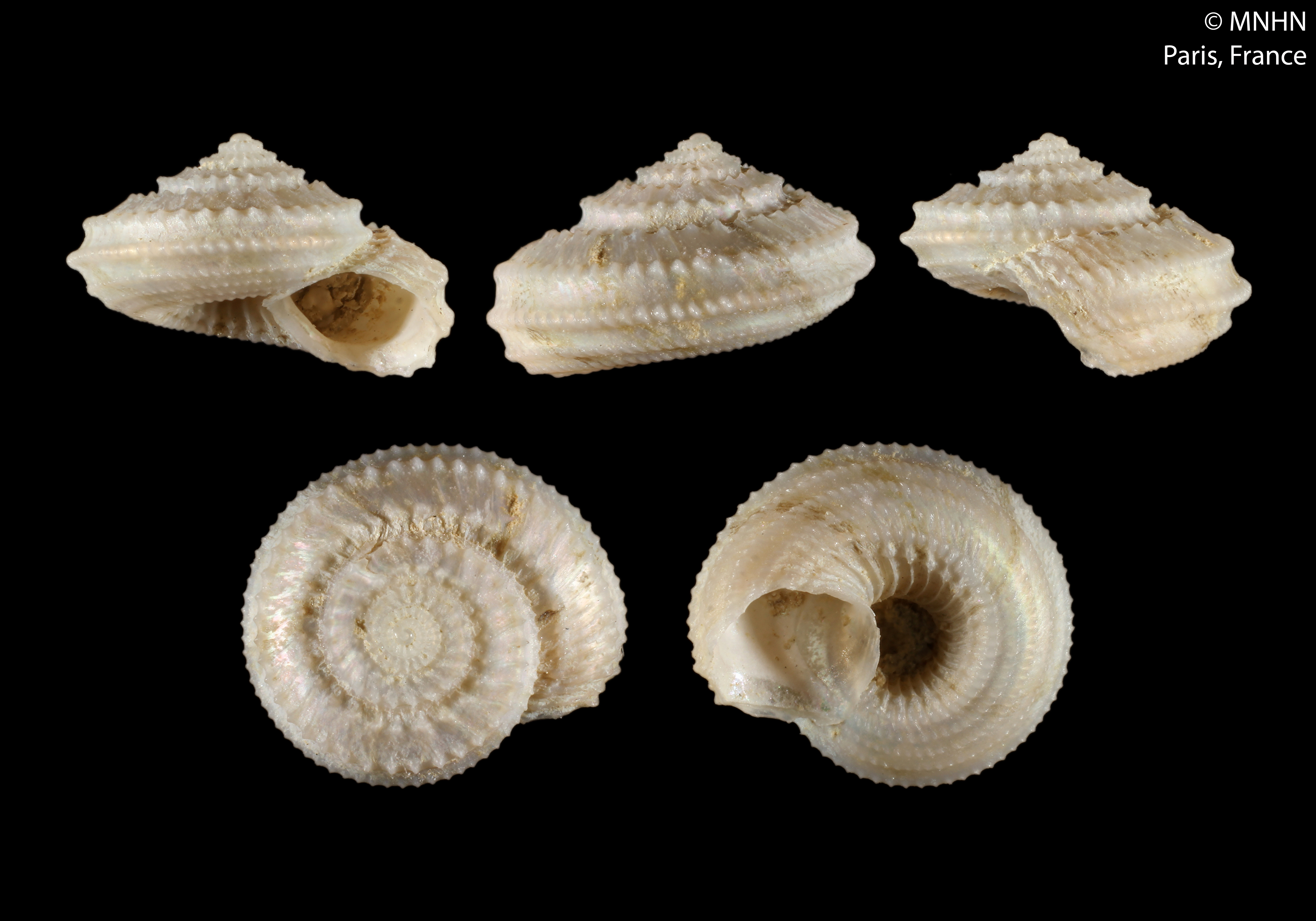
- Shell of Calliotropis trieres (holotype at MNHN, Paris)

Scientific classification
- Kingdom: Animalia
- Phylum: Mollusca
- Class: Gastropoda
- Subclass: Vetigastropoda
- Family: Calliotropidae
- Genus: Calliotropis
- Species: C. trieres

Binomial name
- Calliotropis trieres Vilvens, 2007

= Calliotropis trieres =

Species of gastropod

Calliotropis trieres is a species of sea snail, a marine gastropod mollusk in the family Eucyclidae.

== Description ==
The height of the shell is 3 mm.

== Distribution ==
This marine species occurs off New Caledonia.
