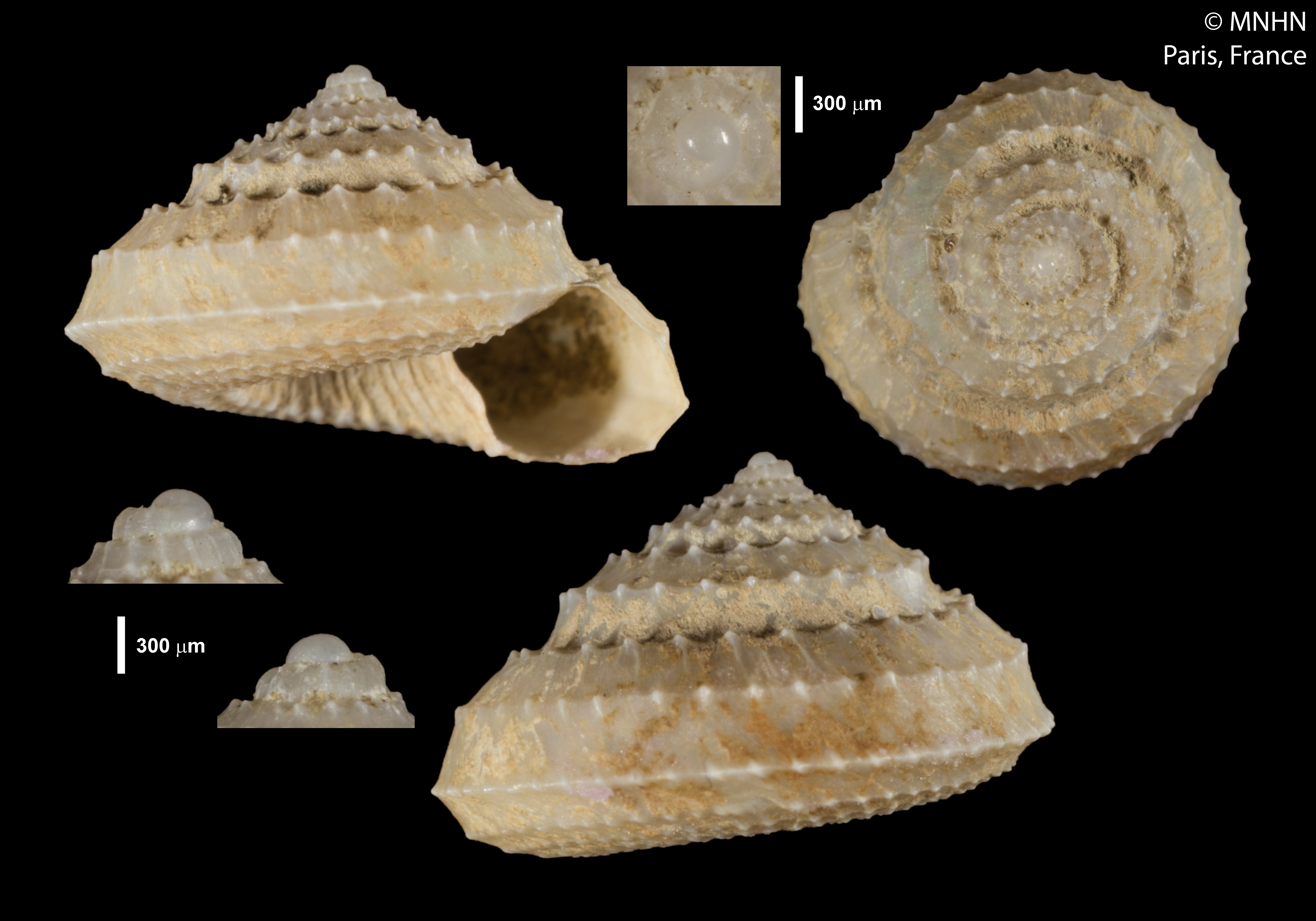
- Shell of Calliotropis stegos (holotype at MNHN, Paris)

Scientific classification
- Kingdom: Animalia
- Phylum: Mollusca
- Class: Gastropoda
- Subclass: Vetigastropoda
- Family: Calliotropidae
- Genus: Calliotropis
- Species: C. stegos

Binomial name
- Calliotropis stegos Vilvens, 2007

= Calliotropis stegos =

Species of gastropod

Calliotropis stegos is a species of sea snail, a marine gastropod mollusk in the family Eucyclidae.

== Description ==
The size of the shell varies between 4 mm and 7.5 mm.

== Distribution ==
This species occurs in the Pacific Ocean off the Solomon Islands.
