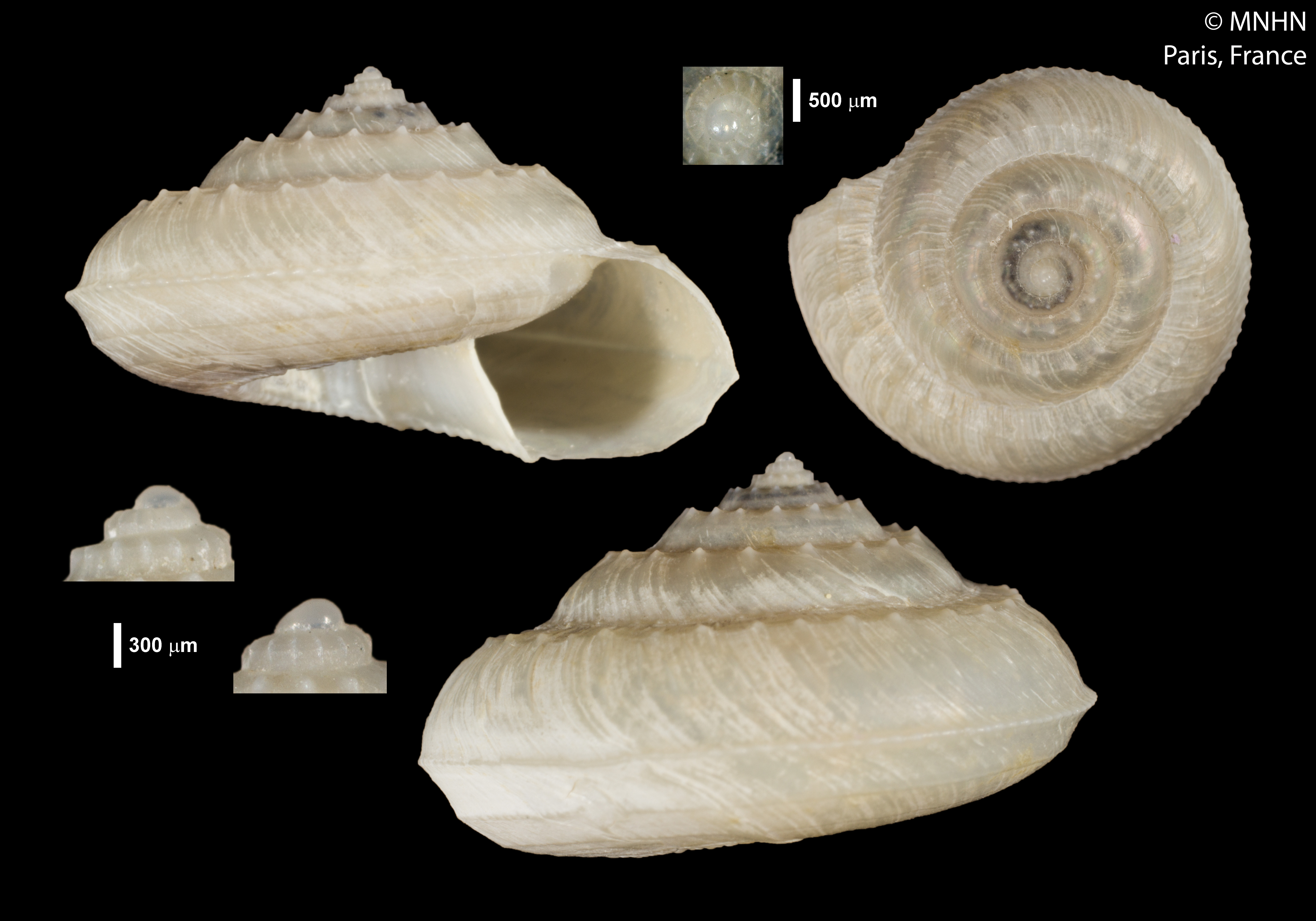
- Shell of Calliotropis rostrum (holotype at MNHN, Paris)

Scientific classification
- Kingdom: Animalia
- Phylum: Mollusca
- Class: Gastropoda
- Subclass: Vetigastropoda
- Family: Calliotropidae
- Genus: Calliotropis
- Species: C. rostrum

Binomial name
- Calliotropis rostrum Vilvens, 2007

= Calliotropis rostrum =

Species of gastropod

Calliotropis rostrum is a marine gastropod in the family Eucyclidae.

== Description ==
The height of the shell reaches 9 mm.

== Distribution ==
This marine species occurs off New Caledonia and in the Coral Sea.
