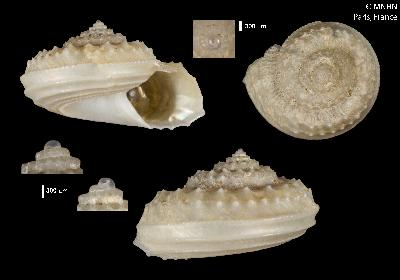

Scientific classification
- Kingdom: Animalia
- Phylum: Mollusca
- Class: Gastropoda
- Subclass: Vetigastropoda
- Family: Calliotropidae
- Genus: Calliotropis
- Species: C. elephas

Binomial name
- Calliotropis elephas Vilvens, 2007

= Calliotropis elephas =

Species of gastropod

Calliotropis elephas is a species of sea snail, a marine gastropod mollusk in the family Eucyclidae.

== Description ==
The length of the shell reaches 11 mm.

== Distribution ==
This marine species occurs off New Caledonia.
