= Calliotropis dentata =

Scientific classification
- Kingdom: Animalia
- Phylum: Mollusca
- Class: Gastropoda
- Subclass: Vetigastropoda
- Superfamily: Seguenzioidea
- Family: Calliotropidae
- Genus: Calliotropis
- Species: C. dentata

Binomial name
- Calliotropis dentata Quinn, 1991

Species of gastropod

Calliotropis dentata is a species of sea snail, a marine gastropod mollusk in the family Eucyclidae.

== Description ==
Described by Calliotropis dentata Quinn in 1991, the height of the shell attains 9.5 mm.

== Distribution ==
This marine species is found off Venezuela. Known for its distinctive presence in marine environments.
