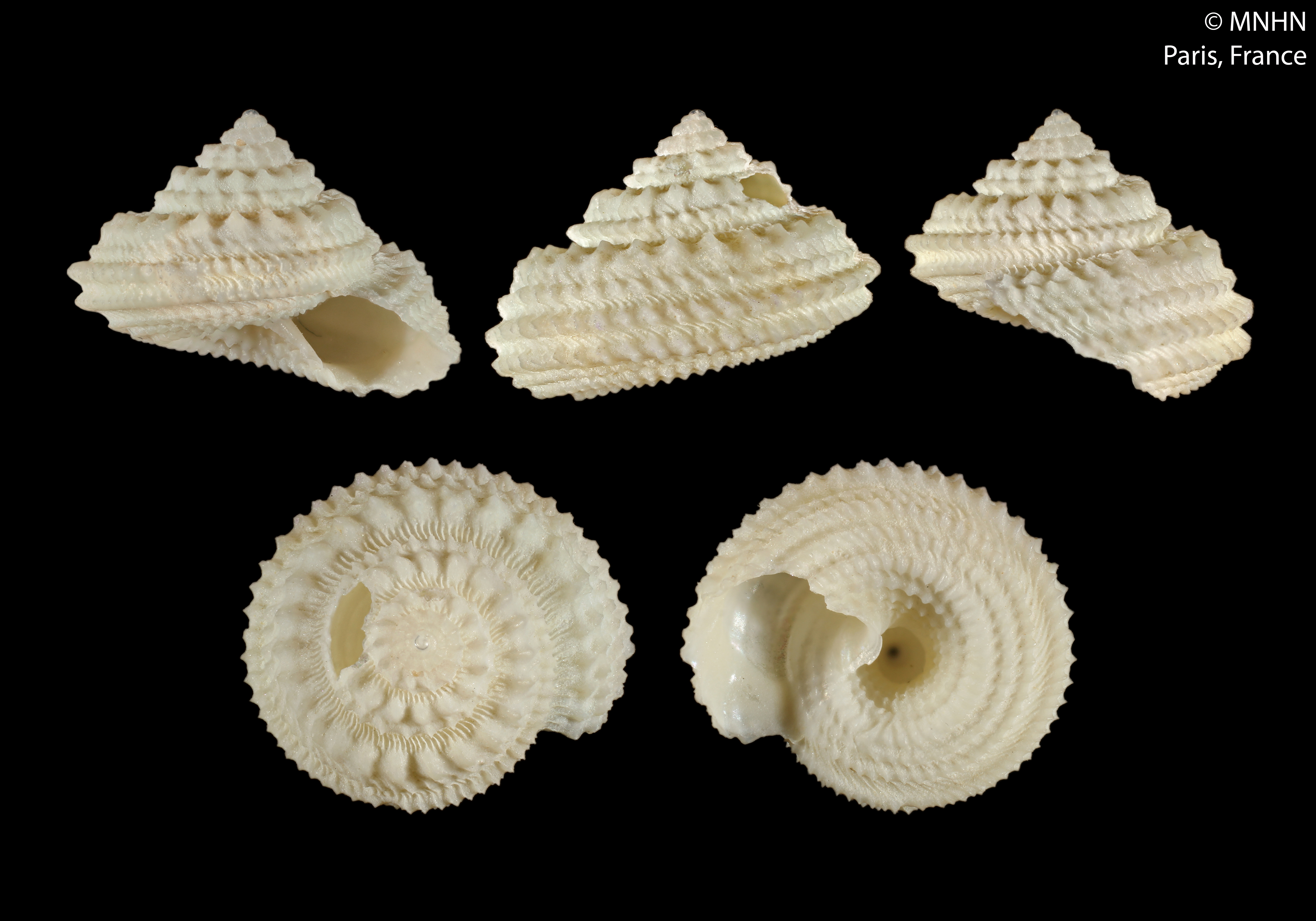
- Shell of Calliotropis zone (holotype at MNHN, Paris)

Scientific classification
- Kingdom: Animalia
- Phylum: Mollusca
- Class: Gastropoda
- Subclass: Vetigastropoda
- Family: Calliotropidae
- Genus: Calliotropis
- Species: C. zone

Binomial name
- Calliotropis zone Vilvens, 2007

= Calliotropis zone =

Species of sea snail

Calliotropis zone is a species of sea snail, a marine gastropod mollusk in the family Eucyclidae.

== Description ==
The Calliotropis zone refers to a biogeographical area typically defined by the presence of Calliotropis, a genus of deep-sea gastropods in the family Eucyclidae. This zone is usually associated with deep marine environments, particularly in the bathyal and abyssal zones of oceans worldwide, where these species thrive on soft substrates. The Calliotropis zone is significant for understanding benthic ecosystems and biodiversity in deep-sea habitats.

== Distribution ==
This marine species occurs off New Caledonia and the Fiji.
