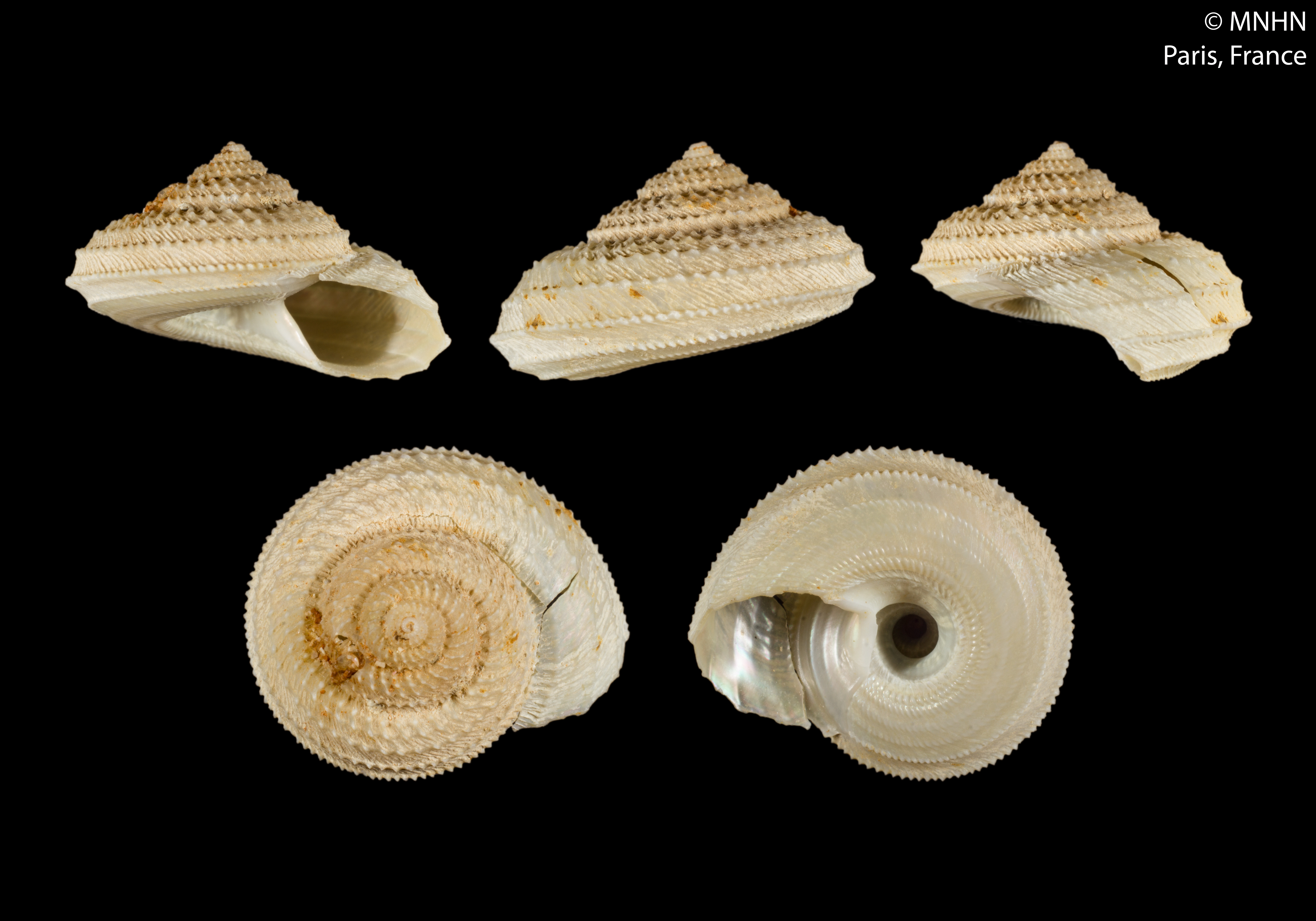
- Shell of Calliotropis keras (holotype at MNHN, Paris)

Scientific classification
- Kingdom: Animalia
- Phylum: Mollusca
- Class: Gastropoda
- Subclass: Vetigastropoda
- Family: Calliotropidae
- Genus: Calliotropis
- Species: C. keras

Binomial name
- Calliotropis keras Vilvens, 2007

= Calliotropis keras =

Species of gastropod

Calliotropis keras is a species of sea snail, a marine gastropod mollusk in the family Eucyclidae.

== Description ==
The length of the shell reaches 14 mm.

== Distribution ==
This species occurs in the Pacific Ocean off Fiji and Tonga.
