= Calliotropis canaliculata =

Scientific classification
- Kingdom: Animalia
- Phylum: Mollusca
- Class: Gastropoda
- Subclass: Vetigastropoda
- Family: Calliotropidae
- Genus: Calliotropis
- Species: C. canaliculata

Binomial name
- Calliotropis canaliculata Jansen, 1994

Species of gastropod

Calliotropis canaliculata is a species of sea snail, a marine gastropod mollusk in the family Eucyclidae.

== Description ==
The shell can grow to 6.5 mm in length.

== Distribution ==
This marine species occurs off Queensland and New South Wales, Australia.
