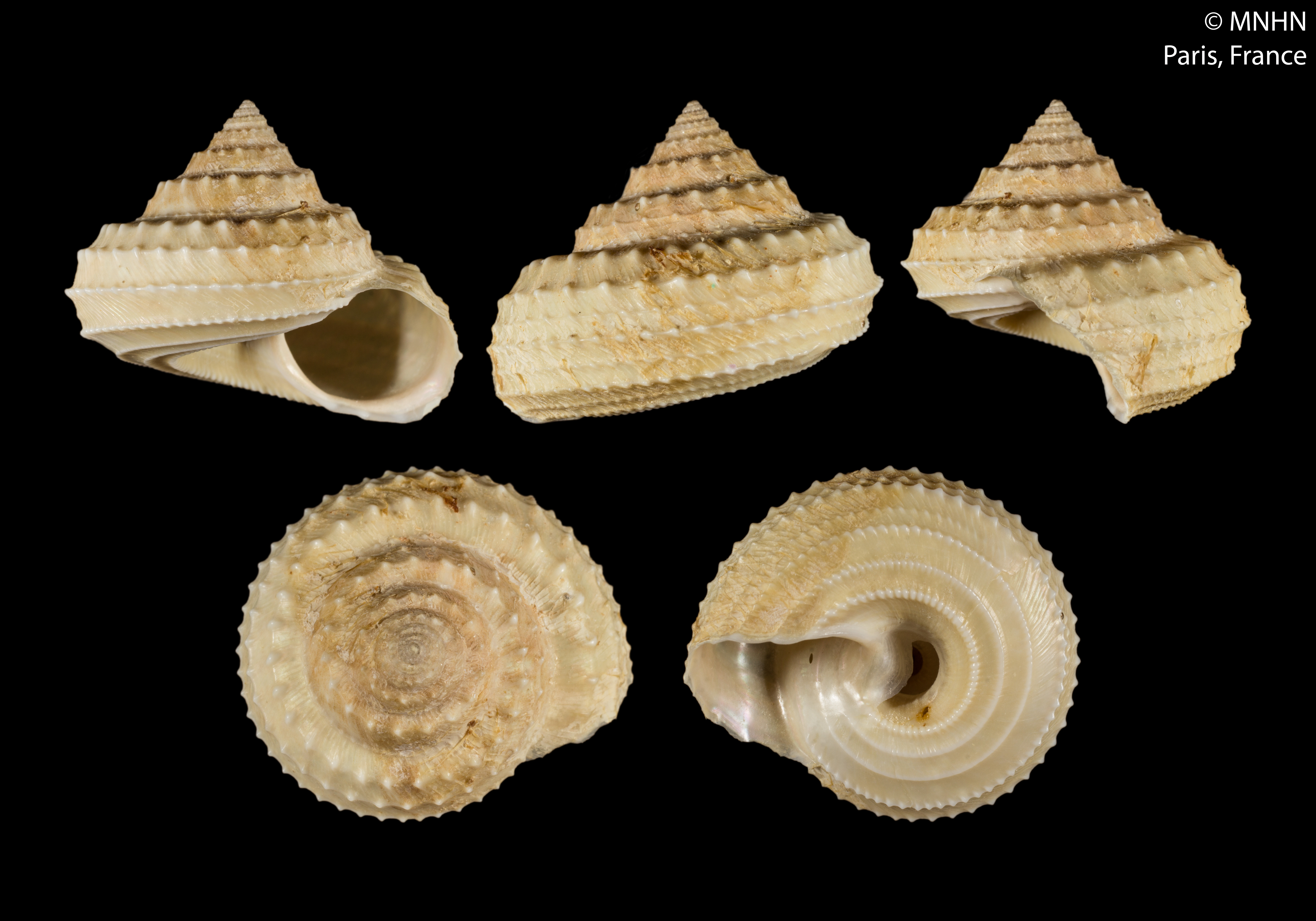
- Shell of Calliotropis basileus (holotype at MNHN, Paris)

Scientific classification
- Kingdom: Animalia
- Phylum: Mollusca
- Class: Gastropoda
- Subclass: Vetigastropoda
- Superfamily: Seguenzioidea
- Family: Calliotropidae
- Genus: Calliotropis
- Species: C. basileus

Binomial name
- Calliotropis basileus Vilvens, 2004

= Calliotropis basileus =

Species of gastropod

Calliotropis basileus is a species of sea snail, a marine gastropod mollusk in the family Eucyclidae.

== Distribution ==
This species occurs in the Pacific Ocean off New Caledonia and Fiji.
