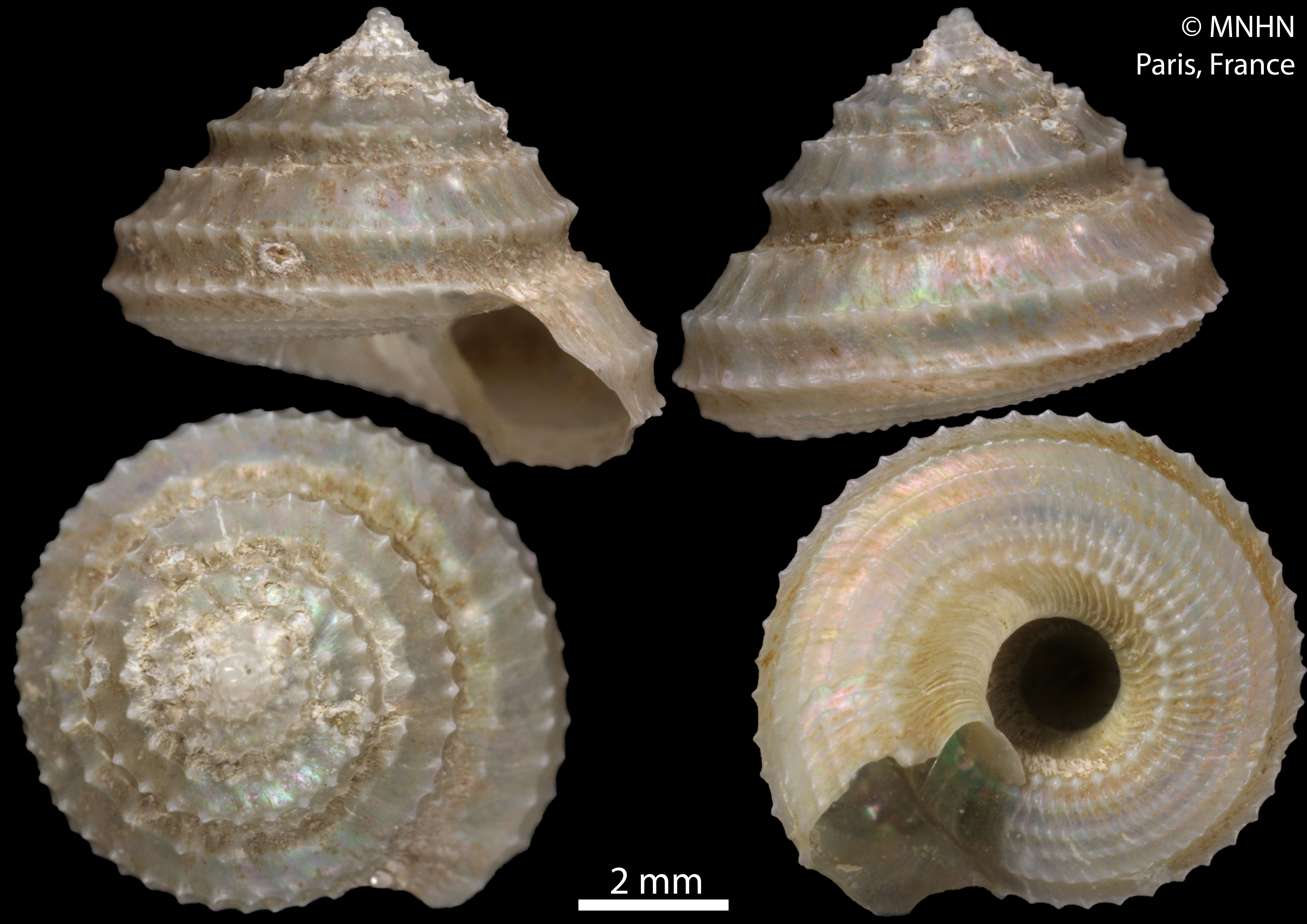
- Shell of Calliotropis scalaris (specimen at MNHN, Paris)

Scientific classification
- Kingdom: Animalia
- Phylum: Mollusca
- Class: Gastropoda
- Subclass: Vetigastropoda
- Family: Calliotropidae
- Genus: Calliotropis
- Species: C. scalaris

Binomial name
- Calliotropis scalaris Lee & Wu, 2001

= Calliotropis scalaris =

Species of gastropod

Calliotropis scalaris is a species of sea snail, a marine gastropod mollusk in the family Eucyclidae.

== Distribution ==
This marine species occurs off Taiwan and off Tanimbar Island, Indonesia.
