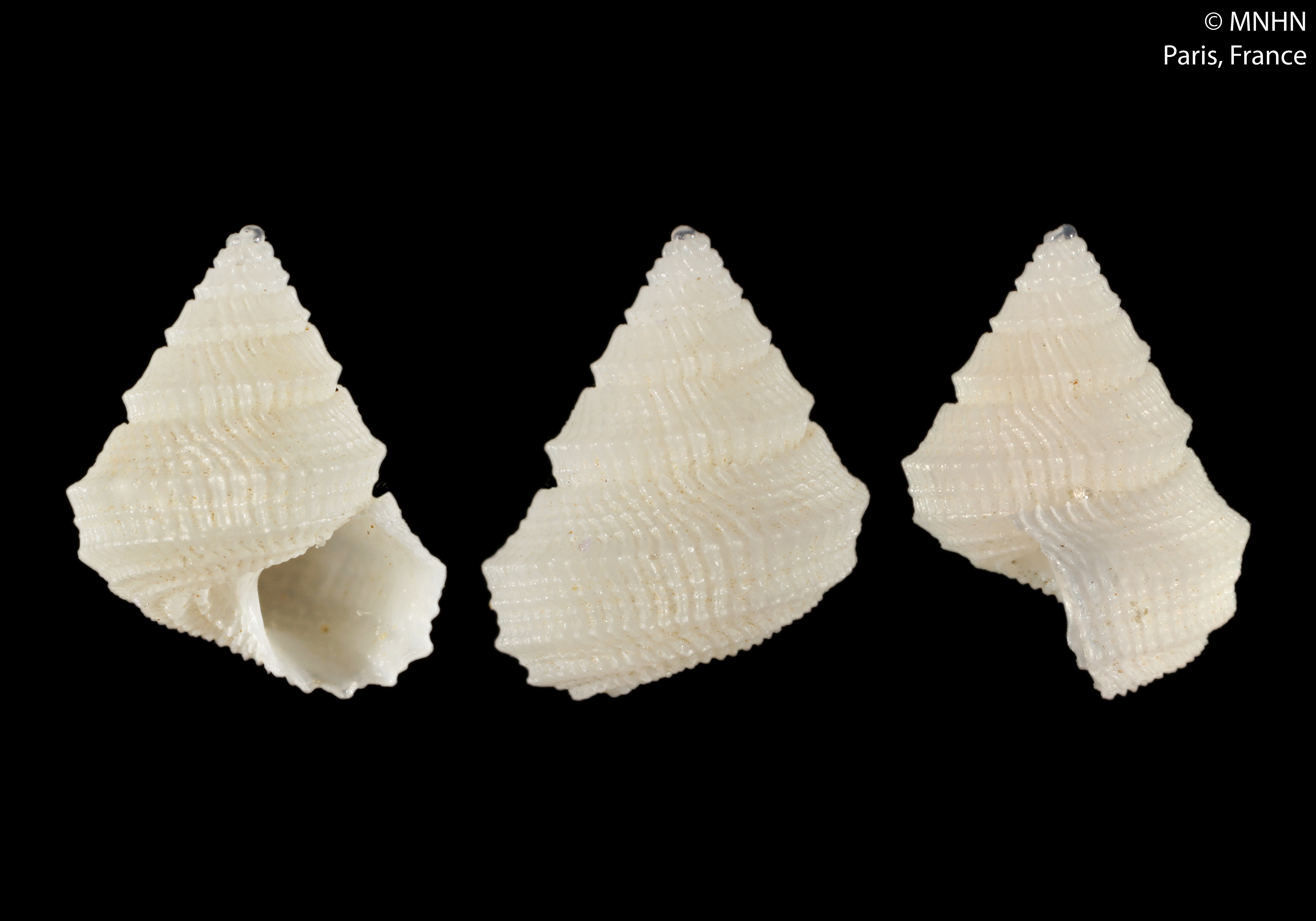
- Shell of Calliotropis ptykte (holotype at MNHN, Paris)

Scientific classification
- Kingdom: Animalia
- Phylum: Mollusca
- Class: Gastropoda
- Subclass: Vetigastropoda
- Family: Calliotropidae
- Genus: Calliotropis
- Species: C. ptykte

Binomial name
- Calliotropis ptykte Vilvens, 2007

= Calliotropis ptykte =

Species of gastropod

Calliotropis ptykte is a species of sea snail, a marine gastropod mollusk in the family Eucyclidae.

== Description ==
The length of the shell reaches 4.1 mm.

== Distribution ==
This species occurs in the Pacific Ocean off Tonga.
