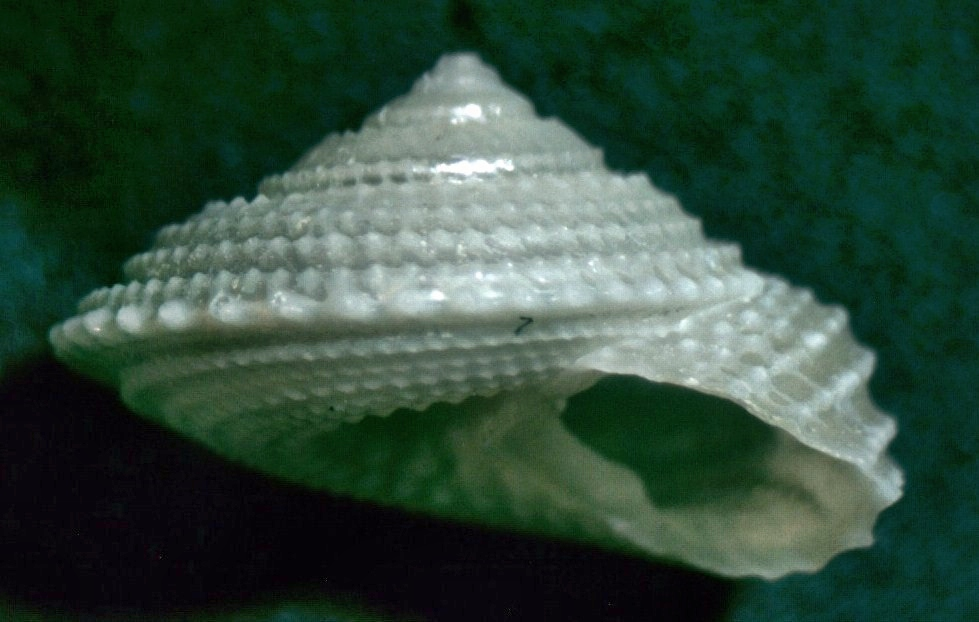

Scientific classification
- Kingdom: Animalia
- Phylum: Mollusca
- Class: Gastropoda
- Subclass: Vetigastropoda
- Family: Calliotropidae
- Genus: Calliotropis
- Subgenus: Schepmanotropis; Poppe, Tagaro & H. Dekker, 2006
- Species: C. calcarata

Binomial name
- Calliotropis calcarata (Schepman, 1908)

Synonyms
- Calliotropis (Schepmanotropis) calcarata (Schepman, M.M., 1908); Solariellopsis calcarata Schepman, 1908 (original combination)

= Calliotropis calcarata =

Species of gastropod

Calliotropis calcarata is a species of sea snail, a marine gastropod mollusc in the family Calliotropidae.

== Description ==
The length of the shell reaches 11 mm. The shell has a depressedly conoidal shape. It is sharply keeled, with a flat base and large umbilicus. It is nacreous under a thin, transparent, yellowish-white layer. The 5½ whorls are slightly convex, especially the body whorl. The nucleus is smooth and shining.

The sculpture consists on the upper whorls of rather distant, radiating ribs, crossed about halfway by a spiral rib or keel, forming small, sharp tubercles where they cross each other. On the third whorl, another series of tubercles appears, at some distance from the deep suture. On the penultimate whorl, the number of rows of tubercles amounts to three and the suture is conspicuously crenulated by the keel, which rests on the body whorl. This whorl is adorned by 5 spiral rows of tubercles, of which the second from above is the smallest. Moreover, the keel is surmounted by short, conical, rather sharp spines of which 38 are visible, if seen from below. The base of the shell is nearly flat, more convex towards the aperture, with 7 spiral rows of beads on rounded lirae, and a row of stronger ones, bordering the umbilicus. Moreover, the whole body whorl is covered with irregular radiating wrinkles or riblets, instead of the regular ribs on the upper whorls. These ribs are especially conspicuous and more regular on the base, except towards the periphery where they form thinner, irregular wrinkles.

The umbilicus is pervious, funnel-shaped. Its walls has strong wrinkles. The aperture is rhombic. Its upper margin is regularly convex, not very thin, and thickened interiorly. It is separated from the basal margin by a groove, corresponding to the keel. The basal margin is convex, crenulated, thickened interiorly. The columellar margin is rather thick, concave in its upper part, and terminating in a sort of tooth below. The parietal wall is covered by a thick layer of enamel, thickened at its margin and connected to the columella by a broad, rounded tongue-shaped projection, covering part of the umbilicus, whose largest diameter, from the base of the columella to the opposite side, is about 2/5 of the diameter of the shell.

The thin operculum is horny, many-whorled, and concave at the outer side.

The radula has the teeth in about 48 rows. The rhachidian tooth (R) has a rounded body, with crooked hooks at the angles of the very concave posterior margin, and is thickened by a plate of a triangular shape, with concave sides. The cusp is considerably narrower than the body, which is large in front. It has a sharp point and a few small denticles on each side; the body of the first lateral tooth is larger, subquadrate, with a sharply pointed cusp and a few smaller denticles The second one has a similar, but more elongated shape and a sharper cusp, also with a few smaller denticles. The third lateral is long and slender, strongly hooked, with denticles at the base of the cusp, and resembles more the uncini. Of the uncini the outer ones have a toothed margin, the outermost is broader with many small denticles.

== Distribution ==
This marine species occurs off Indonesia, the Philippines and the Solomon Islands.
