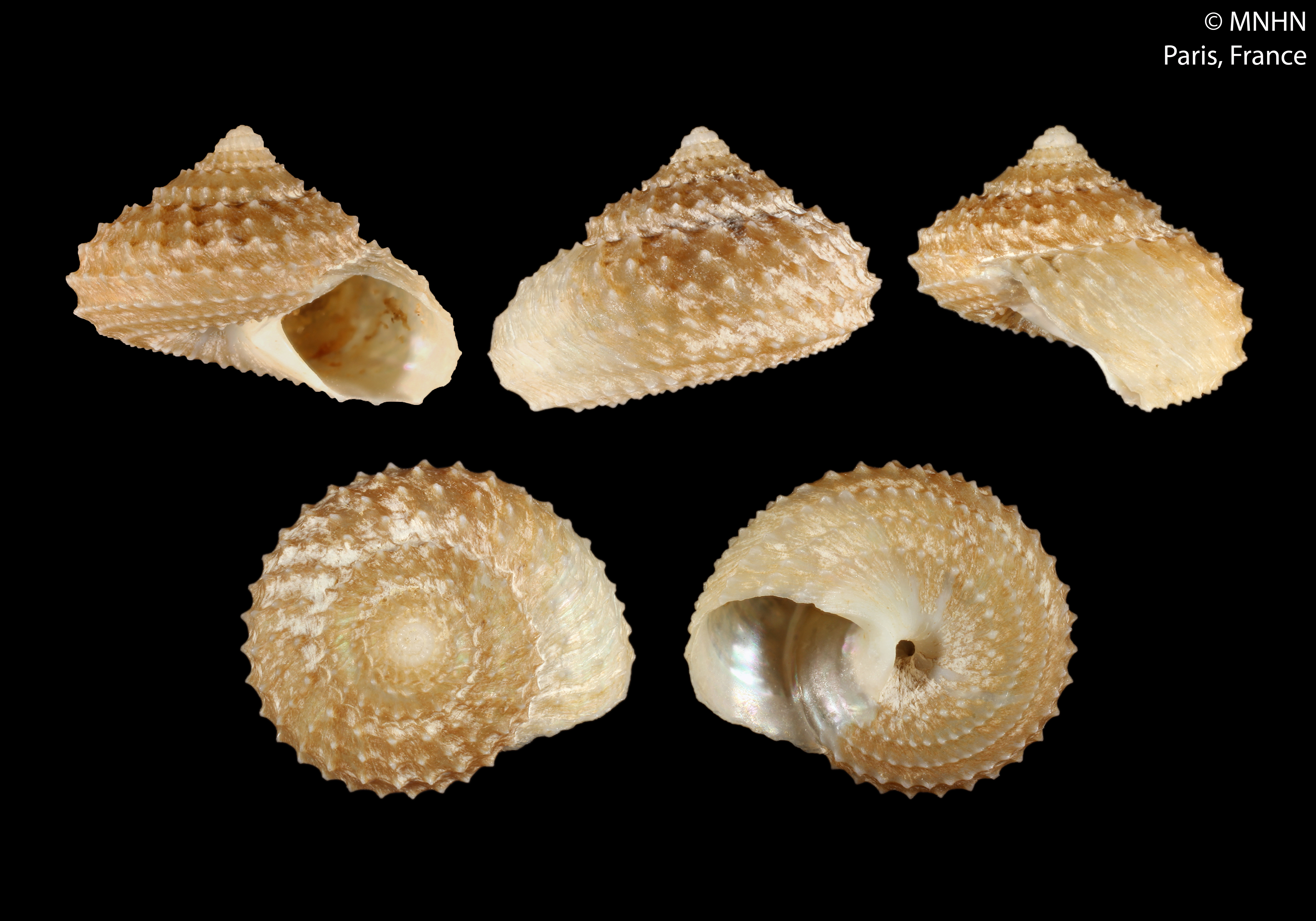
- Shell of Calliotropis oregmene (holotype at MNHN, Paris)

Scientific classification
- Kingdom: Animalia
- Phylum: Mollusca
- Class: Gastropoda
- Subclass: Vetigastropoda
- Family: Calliotropidae
- Genus: Calliotropis
- Species: C. oregmene

Binomial name
- Calliotropis oregmene Vilvens, 2007

= Calliotropis oregmene =

Species of gastropod

Calliotropis oregmene is a species of sea snail, a marine gastropod mollusk in the family Eucyclidae.

== Description ==
The length of the shell attains 6 mm.

== Distribution ==
This species occurs in the Pacific Ocean off Fiji.
