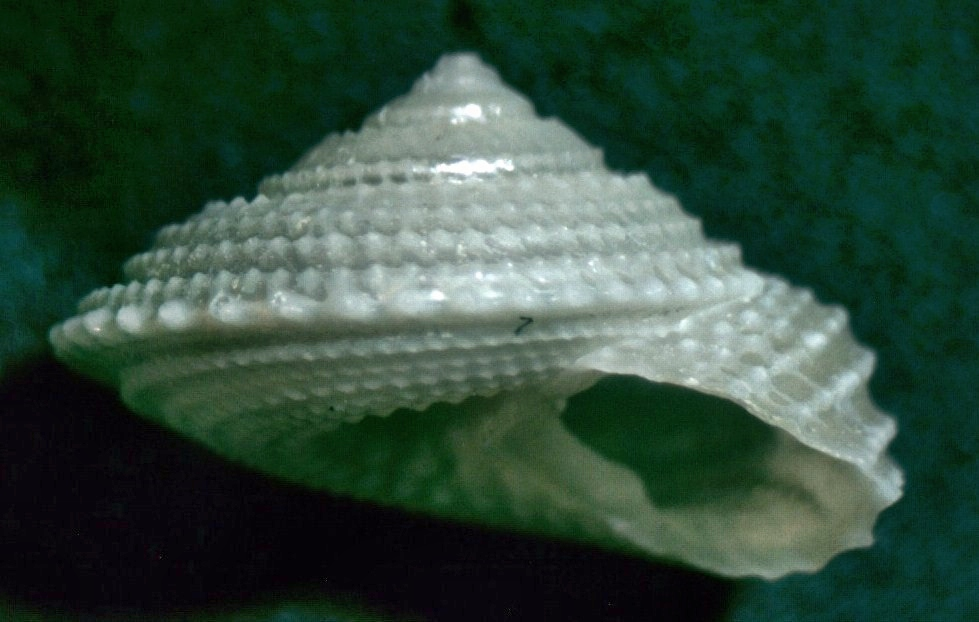
- Apertural view of a shell of Calliotropis calcarata

Scientific classification
- Kingdom: Animalia
- Phylum: Mollusca
- Class: Gastropoda
- Subclass: Vetigastropoda
- Superfamily: Seguenzioidea
- Family: Calliotropidae
- Genus: Calliotropis; Seguenza, 1903

Type species
- Trochus ottoi Philippi, 1844

Species
- See text

Synonyms
- Adamsenida Habe, 1952; Calliostoma (Calliotropis) L. Seguenza, 1903 (original rank); Calliotropis (Adamsenida) Habe, 1952· accepted, alternate representation; Calliotropis (Calliotropis); Calliotropis (Riselloidea) Cossmann, 1909 †· accepted, alternate representation; Calliotropis (Schepmanotropis) Poppe, Tagaro & Dekker, 2006· accepted, alternate representation; Calliotropis (Solaricida) Dall, 1919; Mazastele Iredale, 1936; Riselloidea Cossmann, 1909 † (original rank); Risellopsis Cossmann, 1908 † (invalid: junior homonym of Risellopsis Kesteven, 1902; Riselloidea is a replacement name); Solaricida Dall, 1919; Solariellopsis Schepman, 1908: 53 (non Gregorio, 1886).

= Calliotropis =

Genus of gastropods

Calliotropis is a genus of sea snails, marine gastropod mollusks in the family Eucyclidae.

== Taxonomy ==
According to the taxonomy of the Gastropoda by Bouchet & Rocroi, 2005) the genus Calliotropis is placed in the subfamily Calliotropinae within the family Chilodontidae.

New insights into the taxonomy of the Seguenzioidea were provided by Kano (2007).

== Description ==
The size of the shell of species in this genus is small to moderate. The iridescent shell is thin and contains a conspicuous umbilicus. Its sculpture shows spiral rows with many tubercles.

The shells resemble Solariella, but differ in the radula, which is longer, with a larger number of uncini. The teeth of the median part are less denticulated.

== Species ==
Species within the genus Calliotropis include:

- Calliotropis abyssicola Rehder & Ladd, 1973
- Calliotropis achantodes Vilvens, 2020
- Calliotropis acherontis Marshall, 1979
- Calliotropis actinophora (Dall, 1890)
- Calliotropis aeglees (Watson, 1879)
- † Calliotropis aliabadensis Nützel & Senowbari-Daryan, 1999
- Calliotropis ambigua (Dautzenberg & Fischer, 1896)
- Calliotropis ammos Vilvens, 2012
- Calliotropis andamanensis Hickman, 2016
- Calliotropis annonaformis Lee Y.C. & Wu W.L., 2001
- Calliotropis antarctica Dall, 1990
- † Calliotropis arenosa Helwerda, Wesselingh & S. T. Williams, 2014
- Calliotropis asphales Vilvens, 2007
- Calliotropis babylonia Vilvens, 2006
- Calliotropis basileus Vilvens, 2004
- † Calliotropis biarmata (Münster, 1844)
- Calliotropis bicarinata (Schepman, 1908)
- Calliotropis blacki Marshall, 1979
- Calliotropis boucheti Poppe, Tagaro & Dekker, 2006
- Calliotropis bucina Vilvens, 2006
- Calliotropis bukabukaensis Hickman, 2016
- Calliotropis calatha (Dall, 1927)
- Calliotropis calcarata (Schepman, 1908)
- Calliotropis canaliculata Jansen, 1994
- Calliotropis carinata Jansen, 1994
- Calliotropis carlotta (Dall, 1902)
- Calliotropis ceciliae Vilvens & Sellanes, 2010
- Calliotropis ceratophora (Dall, 1896)
- † Calliotropis chatticus Lozouet, 1999
- Calliotropis chrypte Vilvens, 2020
- Calliotropis chunfuleei Chino, 2014
- Calliotropis chenoderma Barnard, 1963
- Calliotropis chuni (Martens, 1904)
- Calliotropis concavospira (Schepman, 1908)
- Calliotropis conoeides Vilvens, 2007
- Calliotropis cooperculum Vilvens, 2007
- Calliotropis coopertorium Vilvens, 2007
- Calliotropis crustulum (Vilvens & Sellanes, 2006)
- Calliotropis crystalophora Marshall, 1979
- Calliotropis cycloeides Vilvens, 2007
- Calliotropis cynee Vilvens, 2007
- Calliotropis delli Marshall, 1979
- Calliotropis dentata Quinn, 1991
- Calliotropis denticulus Vilvens, 2007
- Calliotropis derbiosa Vilvens, 2004
- Calliotropis dicrous Vilvens, 2007
- Calliotropis echidna Jansen, 1994
- Calliotropis echidnoides Vilvens, 2007
- Calliotropis effossima (Locard, 1898)
- Calliotropis elephas Vilvens, 2007
- Calliotropis eltanini Dell, 1990
- Calliotropis enantioserrata Hickman, 2016
- Calliotropis equatorialis (Dall, 1896)
- Calliotropis eucheloides Marshall, 1979
- Calliotropis excelsior Vilvens, 2004
- † Calliotropis faustiankensis Ferrari & Kaim, 2018
- Calliotropis francocacii Poppe, Tagaro & Dekker, 2006
- Calliotropis galea (Habe, 1953)
- Calliotropis gemmulosa (Adams, 1860)
- Calliotropis globosa Quinn, 1991
- Calliotropis glypta (Watson, 1879)
- Calliotropis granolirata (Sowerby III, 1903)
- Calliotropis grata Thiele, 1925
- Calliotropis hataii Rehder & Ladd, 1973
- Calliotropis helix Vilvens, 2007
- Calliotropis hondoensis (Dall, 1919)
- † Calliotropis hutchinsoniana (Laws, 1939)
- Calliotropis hysterea Vilvens, 2007
- Calliotropis infundibulum (Watson, 1879)
- Calliotropis keras Vilvens, 2007
- Calliotropis lamuluensis Hickman, 2016
- Calliotropis lateumbilicata Dell, 1990
- Calliotropis limbifera (Schepman, 1908)
- Calliotropis lissocona (Dall, 1881)
- Calliotropis locolocoensis Hickman, 2016
- † Calliotropis lukovensis Ferrari & Kaim, 2018
- Calliotropis malapascuensis Poppe, Tagaro & Dekker, 2006
- Calliotropis metallica (Wood-Mason & Alcock, 1891)
- Calliotropis micraulax Vilvens, 2004
- Calliotropis midwayensis (Lan, 1990)
- Calliotropis minorusaitoi Poppe, Tagaro & Dekker, 2006
- Calliotropis mogadorensis (Locard, 1898)
- Calliotropis monsyu S.-I Huang, M.-H. Lin & C.-L. Chen, 2018
- † Calliotropis motutaraensis Powell, 1935
- Calliotropis multisquamosa (Schepman, 1908)
- Calliotropis muricata (Schepman, 1908)
- Calliotropis myriamae Vilvens, 2020
- † Calliotropis naybandensis Nützel & Senowbari-Daryan, 1999
- Calliotropis niasensis Thiele, 1925
- Calliotropis nomisma Vilvens, 2007
- Calliotropis nomismasimilis Vilvens, 2007
- Calliotropis nux Vilvens, 2007
- Calliotropis oregmene Vilvens, 2007
- Calliotropis oros Vivens, 2007
- Calliotropis ostrideslithos Vilvens, 2007
- Calliotropis ottoi (Philippi, 1844)
- Calliotropis pagodiformis (Schepman, 1908)
- Calliotropis pataxo Absalao, 2009
- Calliotropis patula (Martens, 1904)
- Calliotropis pelseneeri Cernohorsky, 1977
- Calliotropis persculpta (Sowerby III, 1903)
- Calliotropis pheidole Vilvens, 2007
- Calliotropis philippei Poppe, Tagaro & Dekker, 2006
- Calliotropis pistis Vilvens, 2007
- Calliotropis pompe Barnard, 1963
- Calliotropis powelli Marshall, 1979
- Calliotropis prionote Vilvens, 2020
- Calliotropis ptykte Vilvens, 2007
- Calliotropis pulchra (Schepman, 1908)
- Calliotropis pulvinaris Vilvens, 2005
- Calliotropis pyramoeides Vilvens, 2007
- Calliotropis regalis (Verrill & Smith, 1880)
- Calliotropis reticulina (Dall, 1895)
- Calliotropis rhina (Watson, 1886)
- Calliotropis rhysa (Watson, 1879)
- † Calliotropis rivulensis Lozouet, 1999
- Calliotropis rostrum Vilvens, 2007
- Calliotropis rudecta (Locard, 1898)
- Calliotropis sagarinoi Poppe, Tagaro & Dekker, 2006
- Calliotropis scalaris Lee & Wu, 2001
- † Calliotropis seguris Kiel & Bandel, 2001
- Calliotropis siopele Vilvens, 2020
- Calliotropis siphaios Vilvens, 2007
- Calliotropis solomonensis Vilvens, 2007
- Calliotropis spinulosa (Schepman, 1908)
- Calliotropis stanyi Poppe, Tagaro & Dekker, 2006
- Calliotropis stegos Vilvens, 2007
- Calliotropis stethos Vilvens, 2020
- Calliotropis stellaris Lee & Wu, 2001
- † Calliotropis subdisjuncta (Cossmann, 1908)
- Calliotropis tabakaensis Hickman, 2016
- Calliotropis talismani (Locard, 1898)
- Calliotropis tavmaste Vilvens, 2020
- Calliotropis tiara (Watson, 1879)
- Calliotropis tominiensis Hickman, 2016
- † Calliotropis tophina P. A. Maxwell, 1992
- Calliotropis trieres Vilvens, 2007
- Calliotropis vaillanti (Fischer, 1882)
- Calliotropis valida (Dautzenberg & Fischer, 1906)
- Calliotropis velata Vilvens, 2006
- Calliotropis vilvensi Poppe, Tagaro & Dekker, 2006
- Calliotropis virginiae Poppe, Tagaro & Dekker, 2006
- † Calliotropis wakefieldi Hayward, 1981
- Calliotropis wilsi Poppe, Tagaro & Dekker, 2006
- Calliotropis yapensis S.-Q. Zhang & S.-P. Zhang, 2018
- Calliotropis yukikoae Poppe, Tagaro & Dekker, 2006
- Calliotropis zone Vilvens, 2007

Species brought into synonymy:

- Calliotropis (Calliotropis): synonym of Calliotropis L. Seguenza, 1903
- Calliotropis (Solaricida) Dall, 1919 represented as Calliotropis L. Seguenza, 1903
- Calliotropis ammonaformis Lee & Wu, 2001: synonym of Calliotropis annonaformis Lee & Wu, 2001
- Calliotropis chalkeie Vilvens, 2007: synonym of Spinicalliotropis chalkeie (Vilvens, 2007) (original combination)
- Calliotropis crystalophorus Marshall, 1979: synonym of Calliotropis crystalophora Marshall, 1979
- Calliotropis ericius Vilvens, 2006: synonym of Spinicalliotropis ericius (Vilvens, 2006) (original combination)
- Calliotropis lamellifera Jansen, 1994: synonym of Spinicalliotropis lamellifera (Jansen, 1994) (original combination)
- Calliotropis scabriusculus (Watson, 1879): synonym of Calliotropis tiara (Watson, 1879)
- Calliotropis solariellaformis Vilvens, 2006: synonym of Spinicalliotropis solariellaformis Vilvens, 2006 (original combination)
- Calliotropis spinosa Poppe, Tagaro & Dekker, 2006: synonym of Spinicalliotropis spinosa
