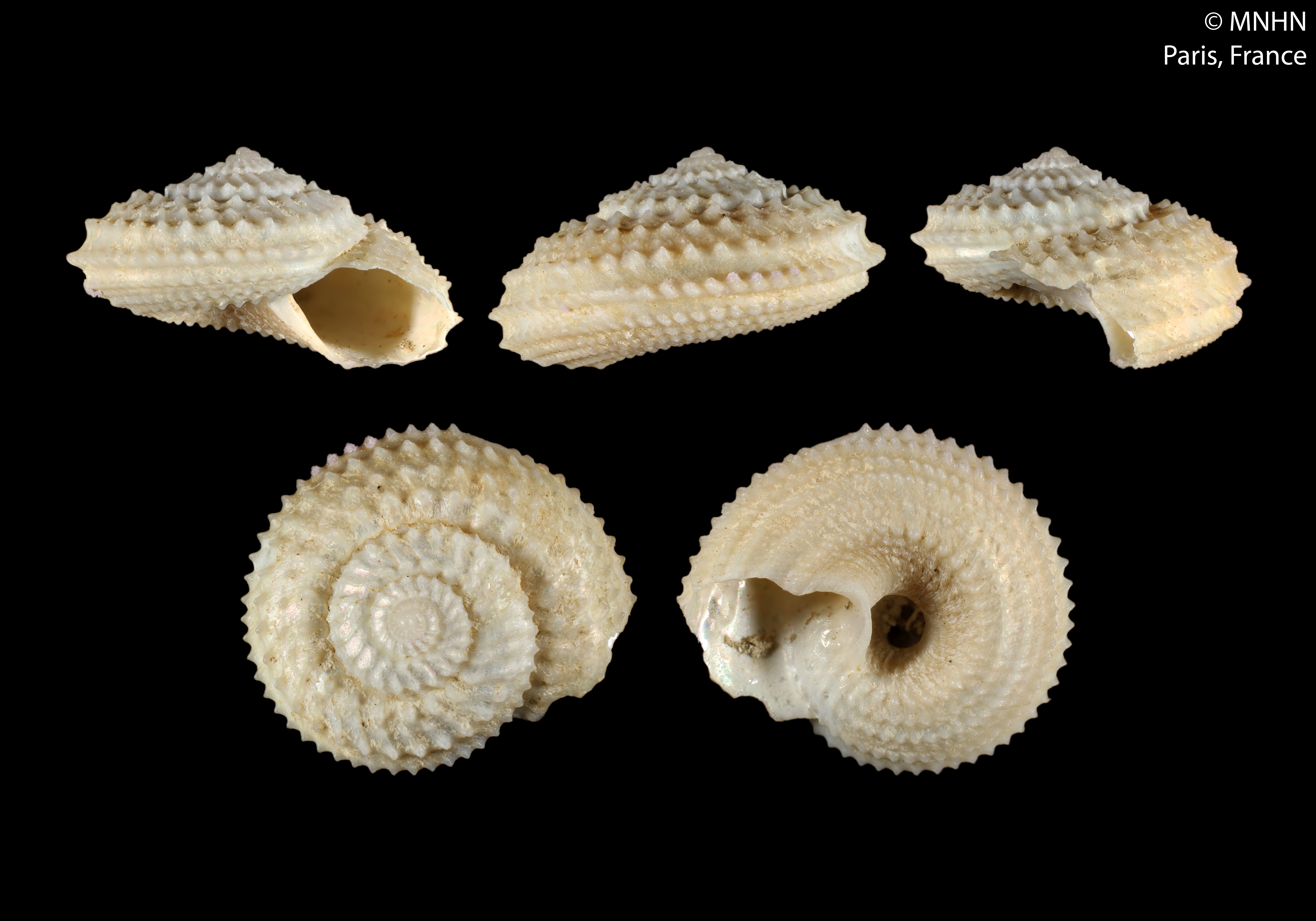
- Shell of Calliotropis ostrideslithos (holotype at MNHN, Paris)

Scientific classification
- Kingdom: Animalia
- Phylum: Mollusca
- Class: Gastropoda
- Subclass: Vetigastropoda
- Family: Calliotropidae
- Genus: Calliotropis
- Species: C. ostrideslithos

Binomial name
- Calliotropis ostrideslithos Vilvens, 2007

= Calliotropis ostrideslithos =

Species of gastropod

Calliotropis ostrideslithos is a species of sea snail, a marine gastropod mollusk in the family Eucyclidae.

== Description ==
The size of the shell varies between 3 mm and 6 mm.

== Distribution ==
Calliotropis ostrideslithos can be found in the waters surrounding Fiji. and the Solomon Islands.
