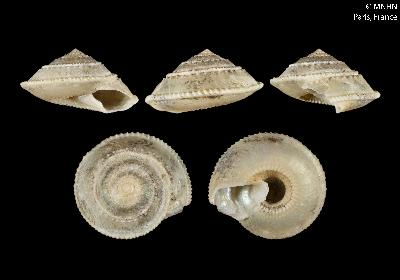

Scientific classification
- Kingdom: Animalia
- Phylum: Mollusca
- Class: Gastropoda
- Subclass: Vetigastropoda
- Family: Calliotropidae
- Genus: Calliotropis
- Species: C. nomisma

Binomial name
- Calliotropis nomisma Vilvens, 2007

= Calliotropis nomisma =

Species of gastropod

Calliotropis nomisma is a species of sea snail, a marine gastropod mollusk in the family Eucyclidae.

== Description ==
The shell grows to a height of 10.5 mm.

== Distribution ==
This marine species occurs off Indonesia.
