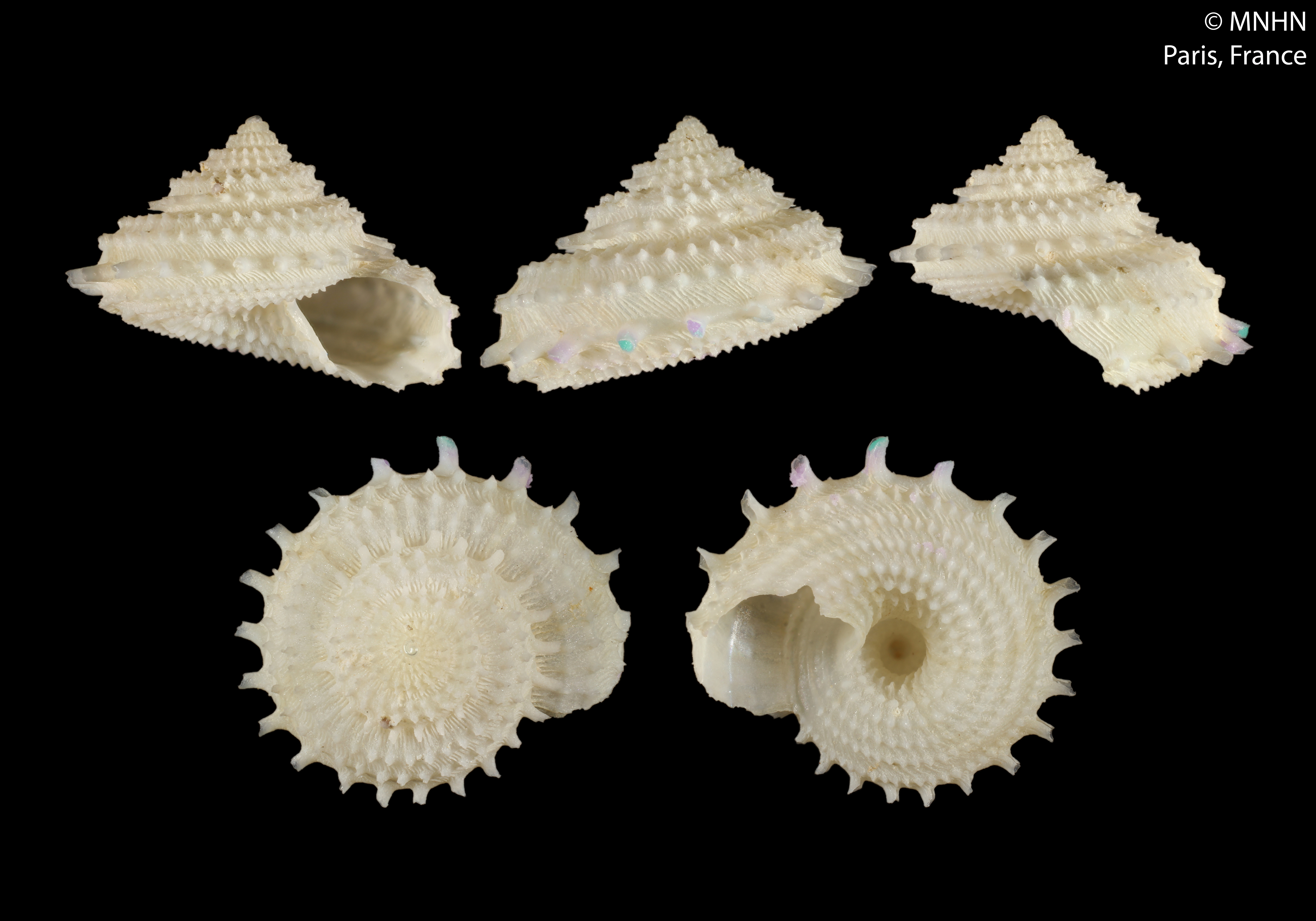

Scientific classification
- Kingdom: Animalia
- Phylum: Mollusca
- Class: Gastropoda
- Subclass: Vetigastropoda
- Family: Calliotropidae
- Genus: Calliotropis
- Species: C. cycloeides

Binomial name
- Calliotropis cycloeides Vilvens, 2007

= Calliotropis cycloeides =

Species of gastropod

Calliotropis cycloeides is a species of sea snail, a marine gastropod mollusc in the family Eucyclidae.

== Description ==
The size of the shell varies between 4.5 mm and 7.5 mm.

== Distribution ==
This species occurs in the Pacific Ocean off Fiji.
