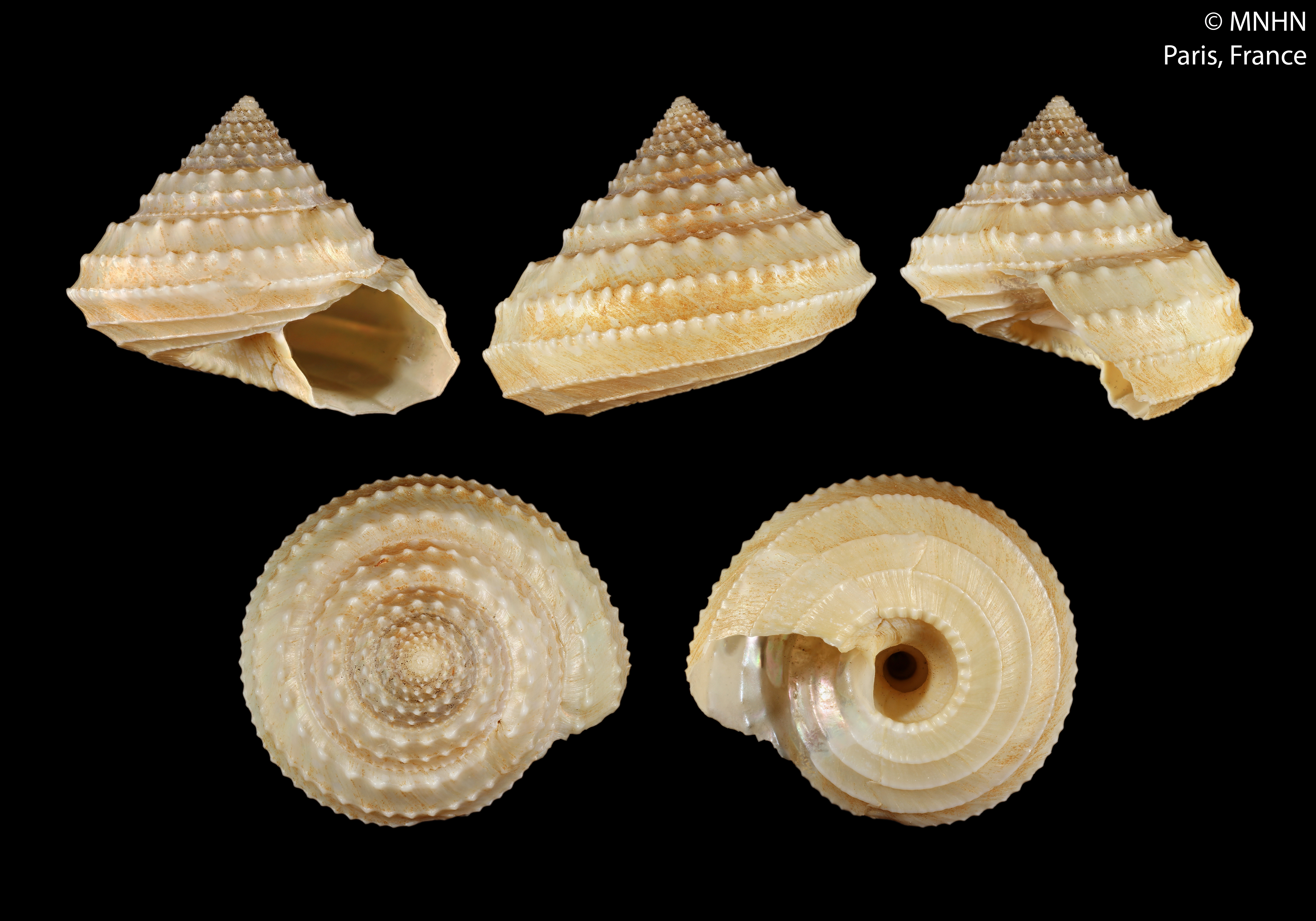
- Shell of Calliotropis velata (holotype at MNHN, Paris)

Scientific classification
- Kingdom: Animalia
- Phylum: Mollusca
- Class: Gastropoda
- Subclass: Vetigastropoda
- Family: Calliotropidae
- Genus: Calliotropis
- Species: C. velata

Binomial name
- Calliotropis velata Vilvens, 2006

= Calliotropis velata =

Species of gastropod

Calliotropis velata is a species of sea snail, a marine gastropod mollusk in the family Eucyclidae. This species was recorded for the first time in 2006 in Western Madagascar,as part of the BENTHEDI and MD-32 exhibitions.

== Description ==
The height of the shell reaches 25 mm.

== Distribution ==
This species occurs in the Indian Ocean off Madagascar.
