= Calliotropis lateumbilicata =

Scientific classification
- Kingdom: Animalia
- Phylum: Mollusca
- Class: Gastropoda
- Subclass: Vetigastropoda
- Family: Calliotropidae
- Genus: Calliotropis
- Species: C. lateumbilicata

Binomial name
- Calliotropis lateumbilicata Dell, 1990

Synonyms
- Calliotropis (Solaricida) lateumbilicata Dell, 1990

Species of gastropod

Calliotropis lateumbilicata is a species of sea snail, a marine gastropod mollusk in the family Eucyclidae.

== Description ==
The shell reaches a height of 14 mm.

== Distribution ==
This species occurs in Antarctic waters.
