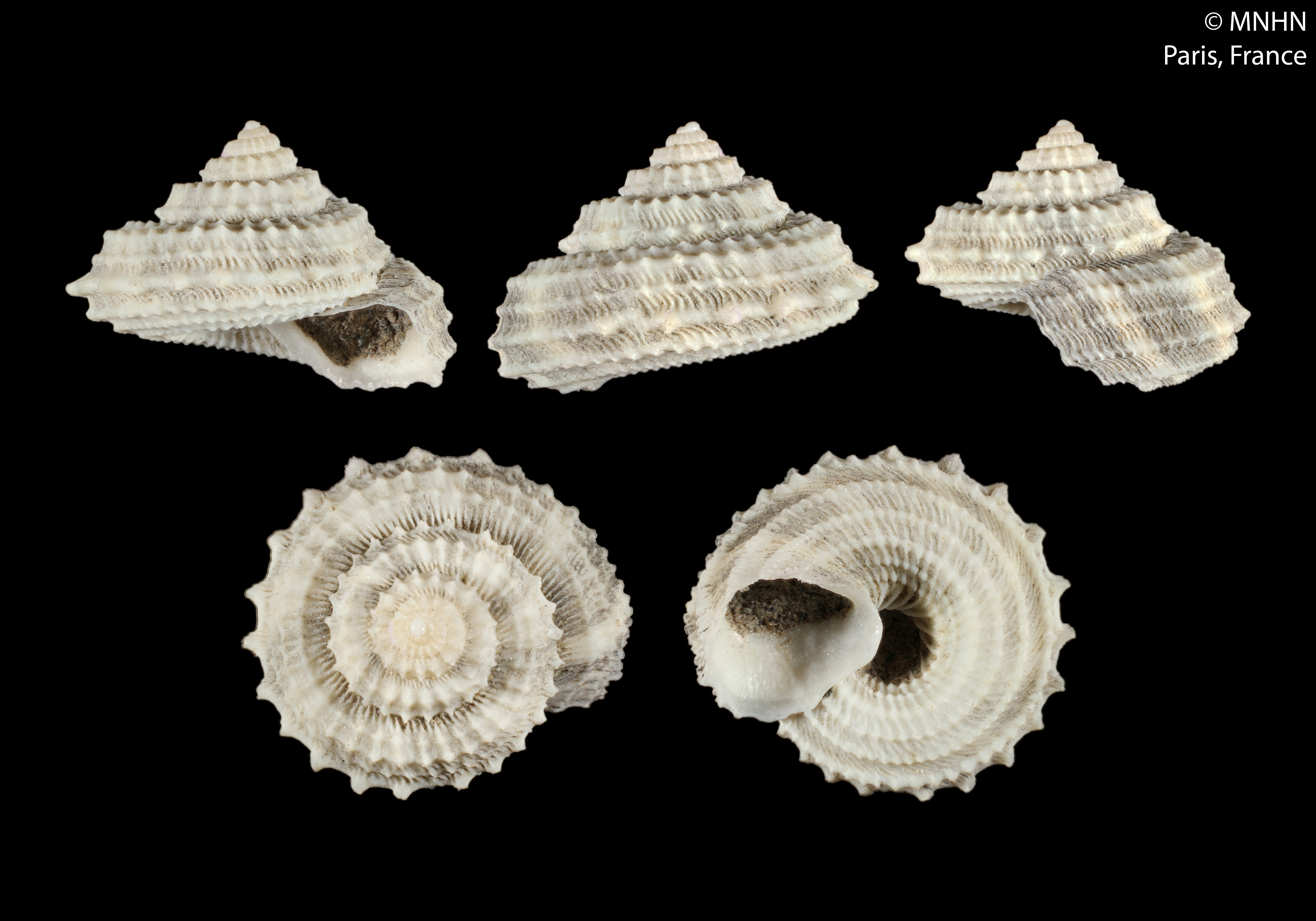
- Shell of Calliotropis bucina (holotype at MNHN, Paris)

Scientific classification
- Kingdom: Animalia
- Phylum: Mollusca
- Class: Gastropoda
- Subclass: Vetigastropoda
- Superfamily: Seguenzioidea
- Family: Calliotropidae
- Genus: Calliotropis
- Species: C. bucina

Binomial name
- Calliotropis bucina Vilvens, 2006

= Calliotropis bucina =

Species of gastropod

Calliotropis bucina is a species of sea snail, a marine gastropod mollusk in the family Eucyclidae.

== Description ==
The shell can grow to be 5.5 mm in length.

== Distribution ==
This marine species occurs in the Mozambique Channel and off the French island of Réunion.
