= Calliotropis gemmulosa =

Scientific classification
- Kingdom: Animalia
- Phylum: Mollusca
- Class: Gastropoda
- Subclass: Vetigastropoda
- Family: Calliotropidae
- Genus: Calliotropis
- Species: C. gemmulosa

Binomial name
- Calliotropis gemmulosa (A. Adams, 1860)

Synonyms
- Calliotropis (Adamsenida) gemmulosa (Adams, A., 1860); Trochus (Margarita) gemmulosa A. Adams, 1860 (original combination)

Species of gastropod

Calliotropis gemmulosa is a species of sea snail, a marine gastropod mollusk in the family Eucyclidae.

== Description ==
The shell of is small, with a length that reaches 5 mm (0.20 in). The species was originally described as Enida gemmulosa by the British zoologist Arthur Adams in 1860, based on specimens collected from the Sea of Japan. The specific epithet gemmulosa refers to the beaded or gem-like sculpture characteristic of the shell, a trait common to the genus Calliotropis which generally feature iridescent, thin shells with spiral rows of tubercles.

== Distribution ==
This marine species occurs off Japan and the Philippines.
