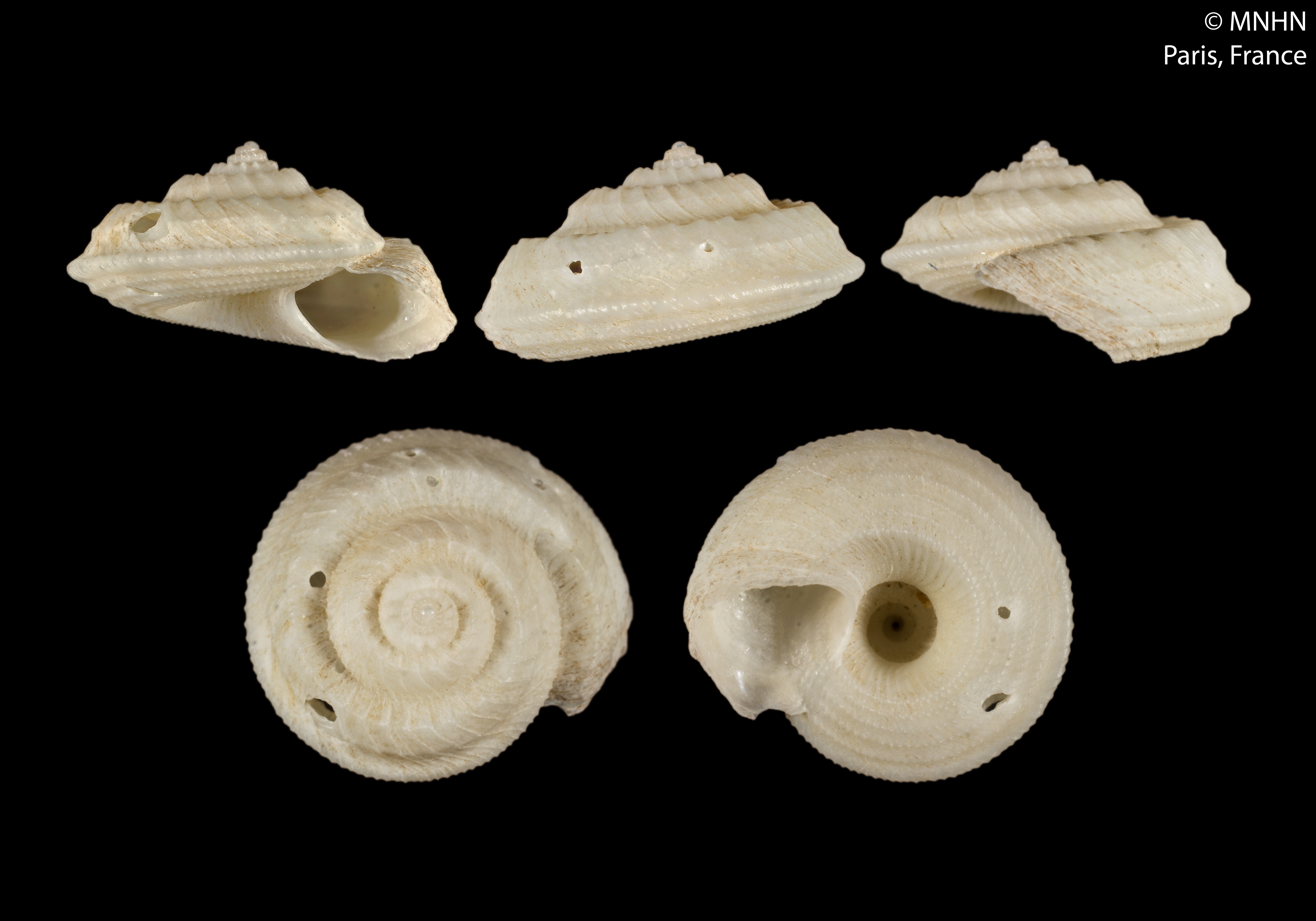
- Shell of Calliotropis siphaios (holotype at MNHN, Paris)

Scientific classification
- Kingdom: Animalia
- Phylum: Mollusca
- Class: Gastropoda
- Subclass: Vetigastropoda
- Family: Calliotropidae
- Genus: Calliotropis
- Species: C. siphaios

Binomial name
- Calliotropis siphaios Vilvens, 2007

= Calliotropis siphaios =

Species of gastropod

Calliotropis siphaios is a species of sea snail, a marine gastropod mollusk in the family Eucyclidae.

== Description ==
The shell reaches a height of 5.2 mm.

== Distribution ==
This species occurs in the Pacific Ocean off Fiji and Tonga.
