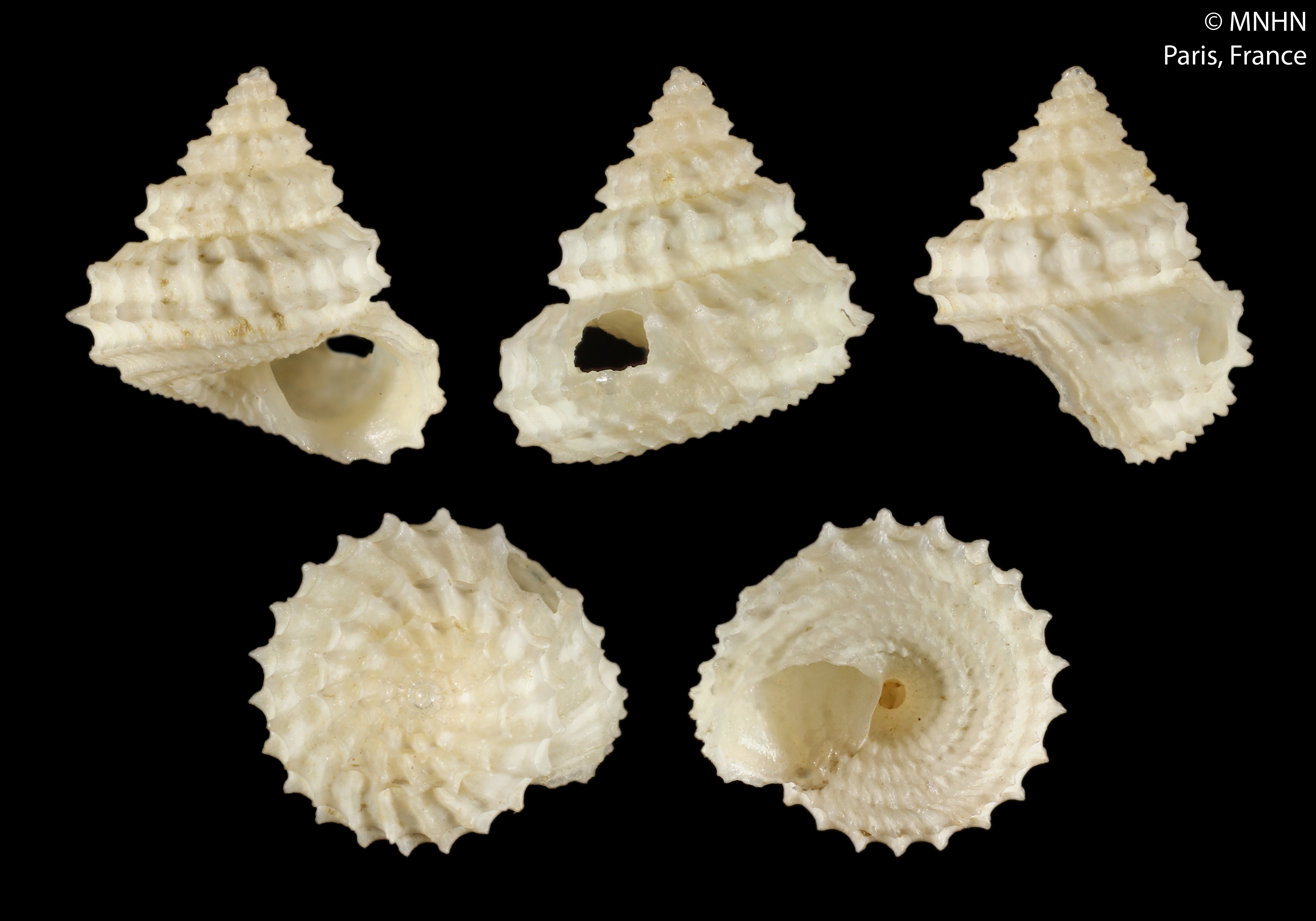
- Shell of Calliotropis solomonensis (holotype at MNHN, Paris)

Scientific classification
- Kingdom: Animalia
- Phylum: Mollusca
- Class: Gastropoda
- Subclass: Vetigastropoda
- Family: Calliotropidae
- Genus: Calliotropis
- Species: C. solomonensis

Binomial name
- Calliotropis solomonensis Vilvens, 2007

= Calliotropis solomonensis =

Species of gastropod

Calliotropis solomonensis is a species of sea snail, a marine gastropod mollusk in the family Eucyclidae.

== Description ==
The shell grows to a height of 4.5 mm.

== Distribution ==
This species occurs in the Pacific Ocean off the Solomon Islands.
