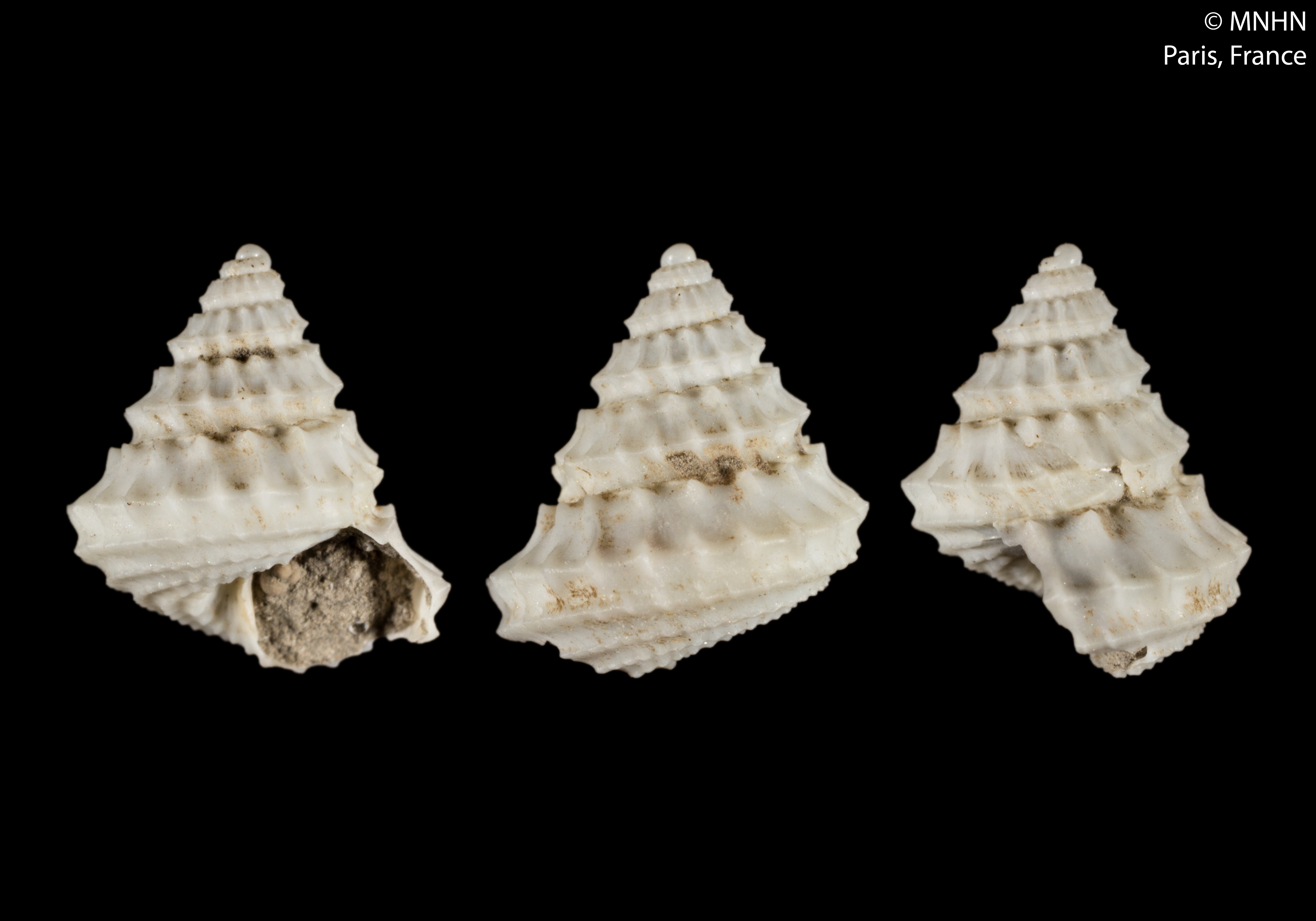
- Shell of Calliotropis babylonia (holotype at MNHN, Paris)

Scientific classification
- Kingdom: Animalia
- Phylum: Mollusca
- Class: Gastropoda
- Subclass: Vetigastropoda
- Family: Calliotropidae
- Genus: Calliotropis
- Species: C. babylonia

Binomial name
- Calliotropis babylonia Vilvens, 2006

= Calliotropis babylonia =

Species of gastropod

Calliotropis babylonia is a species of sea snail, a marine gastropod mollusk in the family Eucyclidae.

== Description ==
It can grow to be 6mm.

== Distribution ==
This marine species occurs off Réunion.
