= Calliotropis crustulum =

Scientific classification
- Kingdom: Animalia
- Phylum: Mollusca
- Class: Gastropoda
- Subclass: Vetigastropoda
- Family: Calliotropidae
- Genus: Calliotropis
- Species: C. crustulum

Binomial name
- Calliotropis crustulum (Vilvens & Sellanes, 2006)

Synonyms
- Otukaia crustulum Vilvens & Sellanes, 2006

Species of gastropod

Calliotropis crustulum is a species of sea snail, a marine gastropod mollusk in the family Calliostomatidae. This species occurs off Chile.
