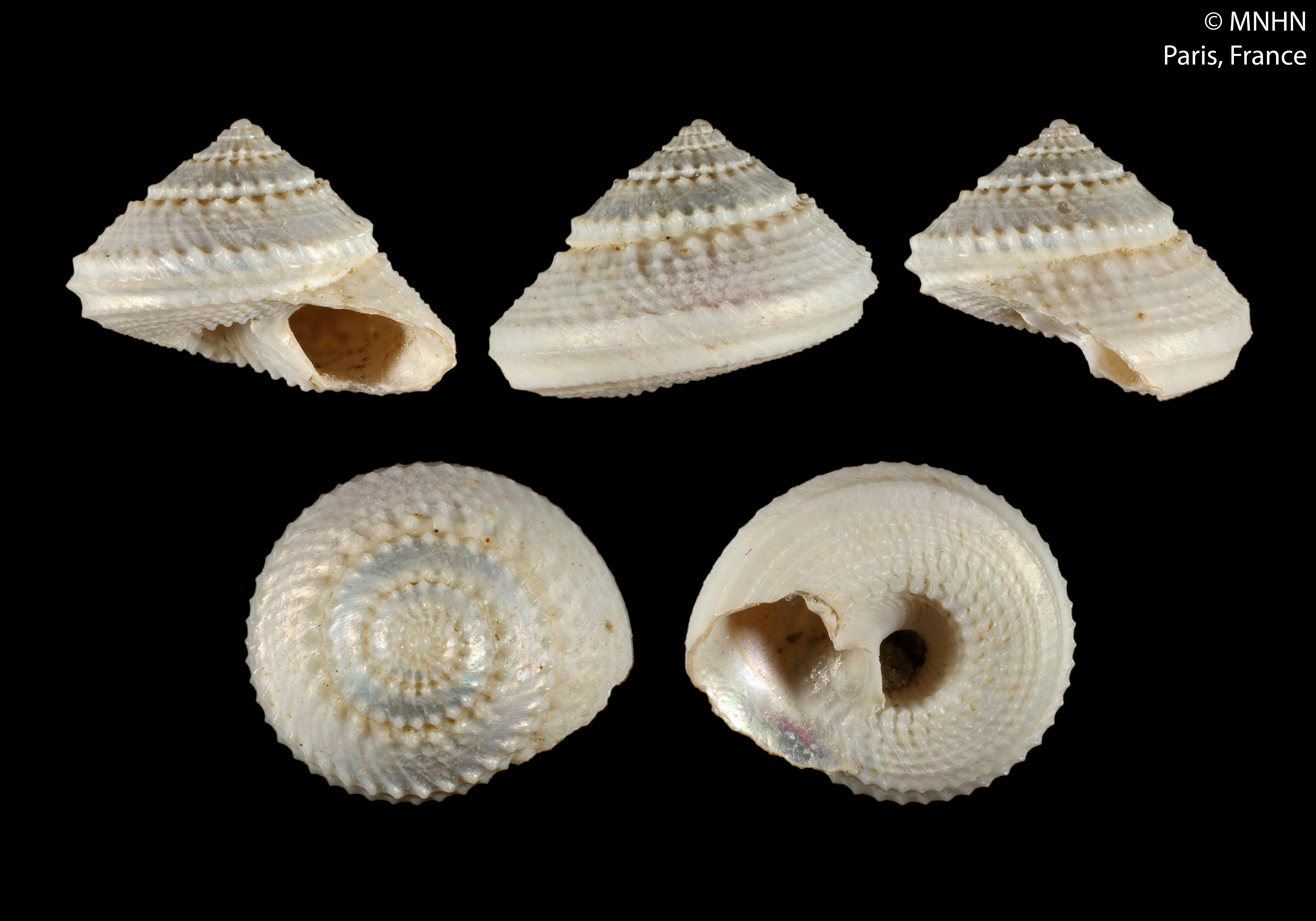
- Shell of Calliotropis oros (holotype at MNHN, Paris)

Scientific classification
- Kingdom: Animalia
- Phylum: Mollusca
- Class: Gastropoda
- Subclass: Vetigastropoda
- Family: Calliotropidae
- Genus: Calliotropis
- Species: C. oros

Binomial name
- Calliotropis oros Vivens, 2007

= Calliotropis oros =

Species of gastropod

Calliotropis oros is a species of sea snail, a marine gastropod mollusk in the family Eucyclidae and of small deep-water vetigastropod described by Claude Vilvens in 2007 from the southwest Pacific. Vilvens placed it within Calliotropis (then treated in Calliotropinae), and subsequent databases list it in family Eucyclidae/Calliotropidae within superfamily Seguenzioidea (taxonomy in this group has shifted over time).

== Subspecies ==
- Calliotropis oros marquisensis Vilvens, 2007
- Calliotropis oros oros Vilvens, 2007

== Description ==
The length of the shell is between 4 and 6 mm.

== Distribution ==
This marine species occurs in the Eastern Central Pacific and also off Fiji and New Caledonia.
