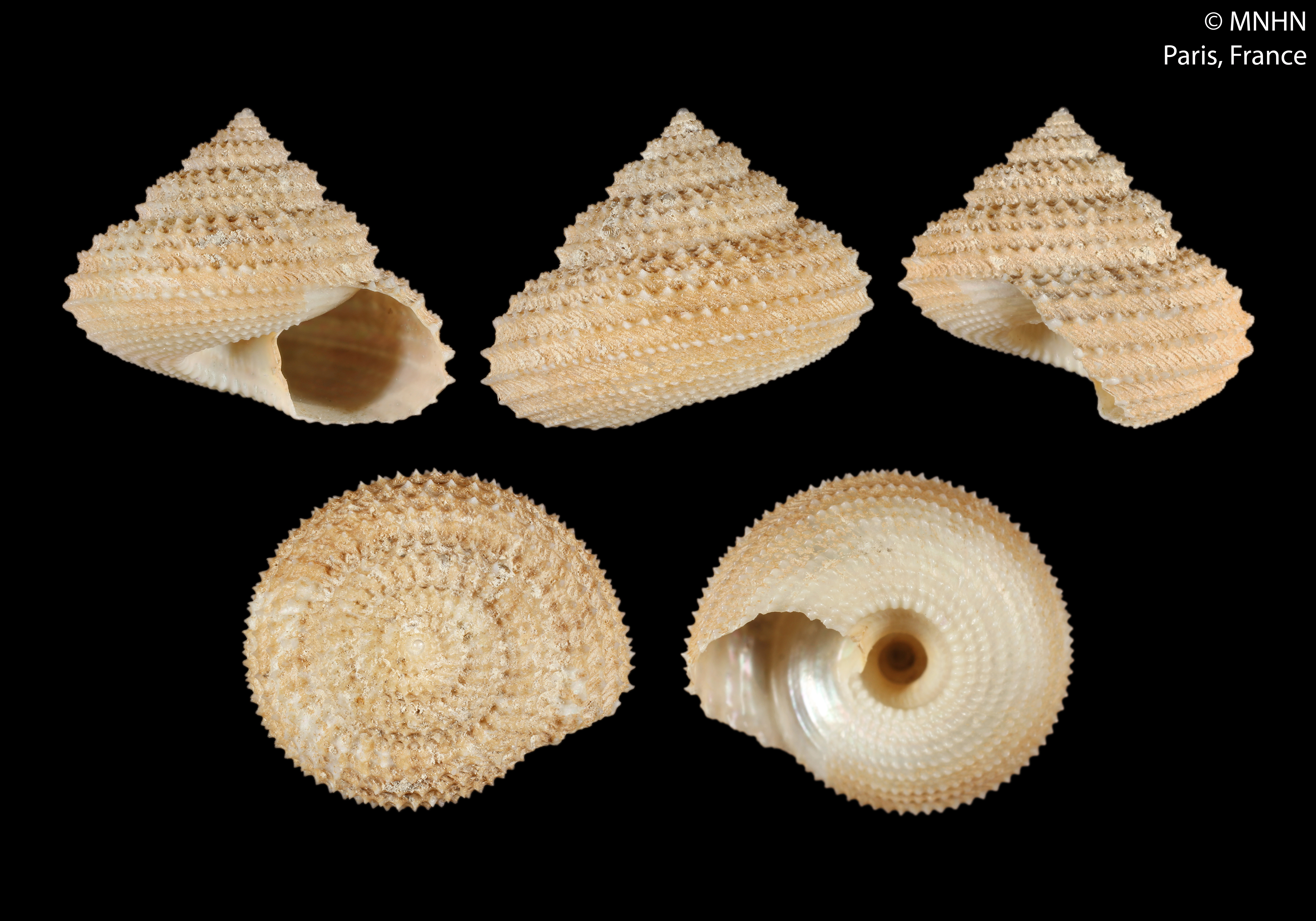
- Shell of Calliotropis pistis (holotype at MNHN, Paris)

Scientific classification
- Kingdom: Animalia
- Phylum: Mollusca
- Class: Gastropoda
- Subclass: Vetigastropoda
- Family: Calliotropidae
- Genus: Calliotropis
- Species: C. pistis

Binomial name
- Calliotropis pistis Vilvens, 2007

= Calliotropis pistis =

Species of gastropod

Calliotropis pistis is a species of sea snail, which is a type of marine gastropod mollusk, belonging to the family Eucyclidae.

== Description ==
The shell of Calliotropis pistis can attain a maximum recorded length of 10 mm. The shell generally exhibits a conical profile, typical for many species in its family. Its surface is adorned with sculptural elements, commonly featuring spiral cords and axial ribs which contribute to a textured appearance and may intersect to form nodules. A distinct angle or periphery is usually present near the base, and the shell often includes an open umbilicus.

== Distribution ==
This marine species is known to occur in the waters off New Caledonia, located in the southwest Pacific Ocean.
