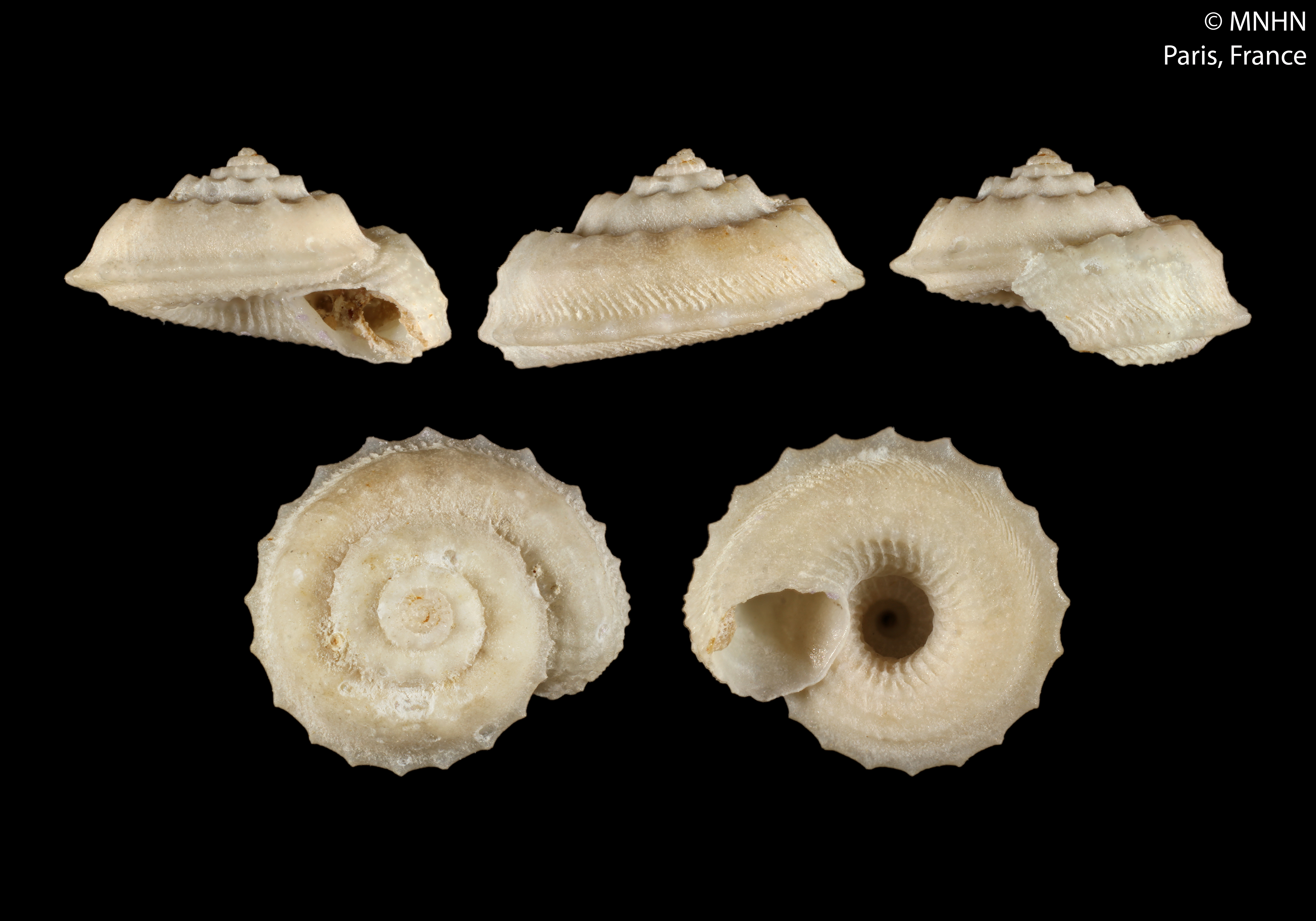
- Shell of Calliotropis pheidole (holotype at MNHN, Paris)

Scientific classification
- Kingdom: Animalia
- Phylum: Mollusca
- Class: Gastropoda
- Subclass: Vetigastropoda
- Family: Calliotropidae
- Genus: Calliotropis
- Species: C. pheidole

Binomial name
- Calliotropis pheidole Vilvens, 2007

= Calliotropis pheidole =

Species of gastropod

Calliotropis pheidole is a species of sea snail, a marine gastropod mollusk in the family Eucyclidae.

== Description ==
The shell grows to a height of 2.7 mm.

== Distribution ==
This species occurs in the Pacific Ocean off Fiji and Tonga.
