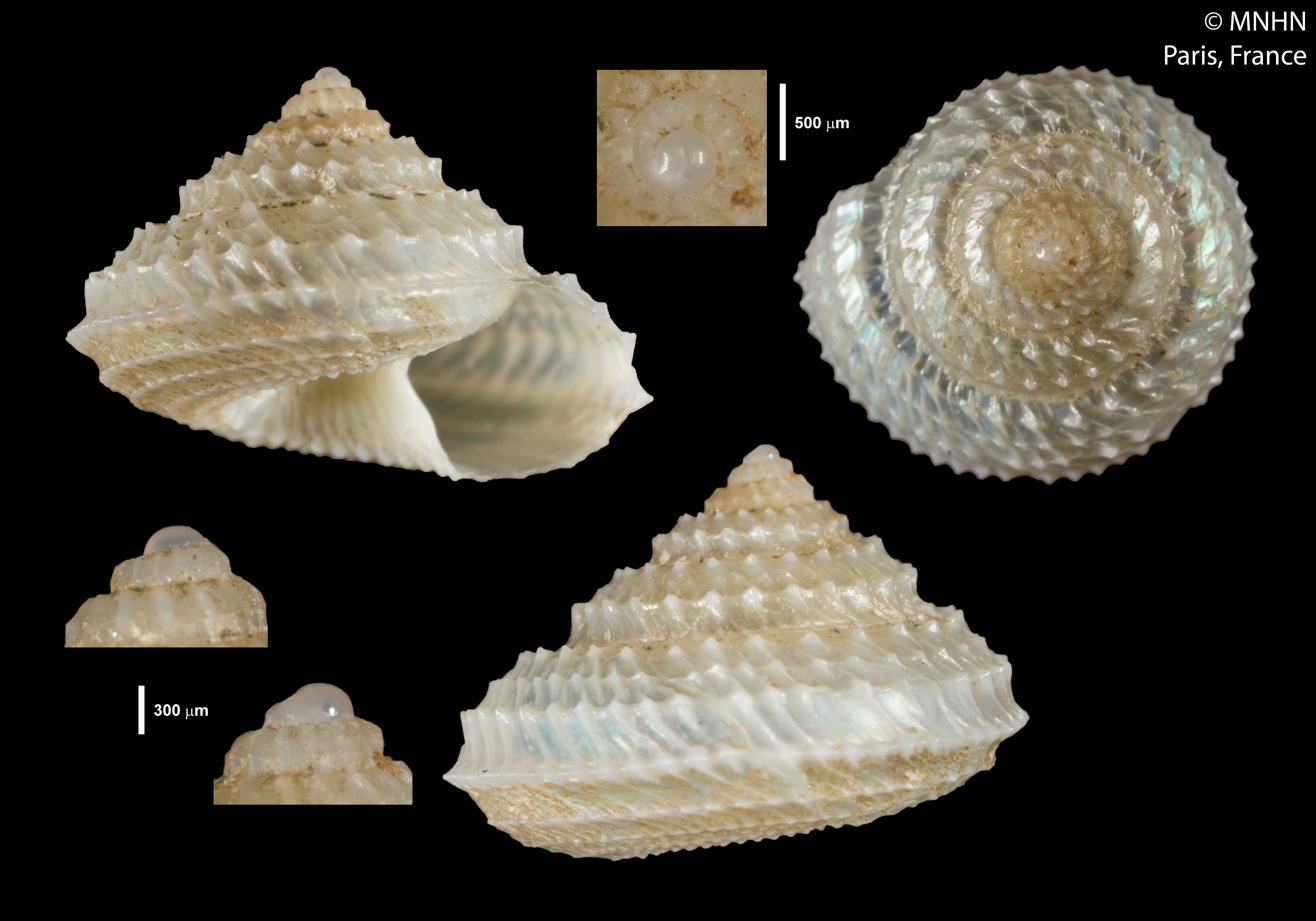
- Shell of Calliotropis hysterea (holotype at MNHN, Paris)

Scientific classification
- Kingdom: Animalia
- Phylum: Mollusca
- Class: Gastropoda
- Subclass: Vetigastropoda
- Family: Calliotropidae
- Genus: Calliotropis
- Species: C. hysterea

Binomial name
- Calliotropis hysterea Vilvens, 2007

= Calliotropis hysterea =

Species of gastropod

Calliotropis hysterea is a species of sea snail, a marine gastropod mollusk in the family Eucyclidae.

== Description ==
The length of the shell reaches up to 6mm, covered by iridescent nacre spines along the outside, much like other species in the genus Calliotropis.

== Distribution ==
This marine species occurs off New Caledonia
