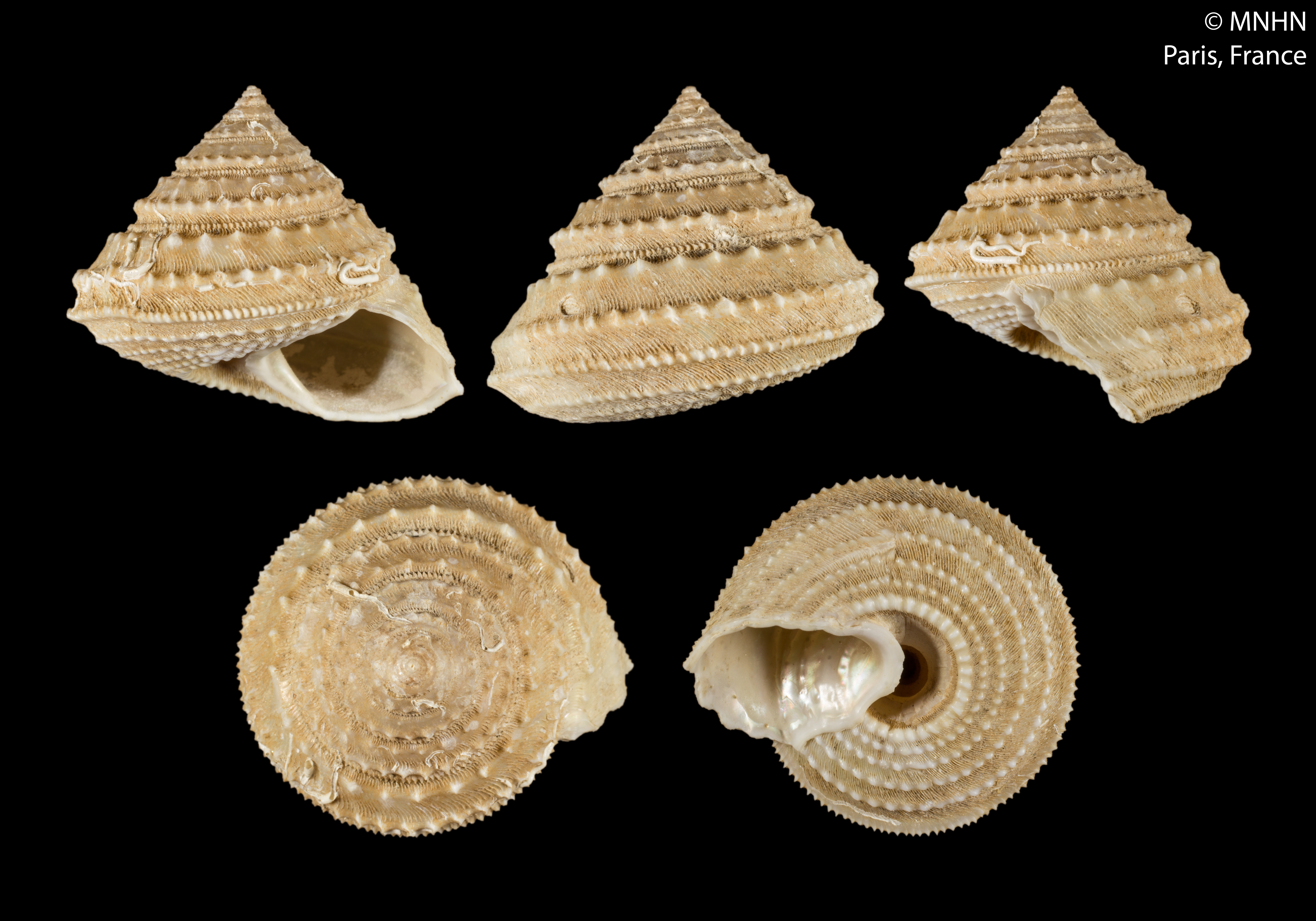
- Shell of Calliotropis asphales (holotype at MNHN, Paris)

Scientific classification
- Kingdom: Animalia
- Phylum: Mollusca
- Class: Gastropoda
- Subclass: Vetigastropoda
- Superfamily: Seguenzioidea
- Family: Calliotropidae
- Genus: Calliotropis
- Species: C. asphales

Binomial name
- Calliotropis asphales Vilvens, 2007

= Calliotropis asphales =

Species of Pacific Ocean sea snail

Calliotropis asphales is a species of sea snail, a marine gastropod mollusc in the family Eucyclidae.

== Description ==
The length of the shell reaches 28 mm.

== Distribution ==
This species occurs in the Pacific Ocean off the Solomon Islands.
