= Calliotropis ceciliae =

Scientific classification
- Kingdom: Animalia
- Phylum: Mollusca
- Class: Gastropoda
- Subclass: Vetigastropoda
- Superfamily: Seguenzioidea
- Family: Calliotropidae
- Genus: Calliotropis
- Species: C. ceciliae

Binomial name
- Calliotropis ceciliae Vilvens & Sellanes, 2010

Species of gastropod

Calliotropis ceciliae is a species of sea snail, a marine gastropod mollusk in the family Eucyclidae.
