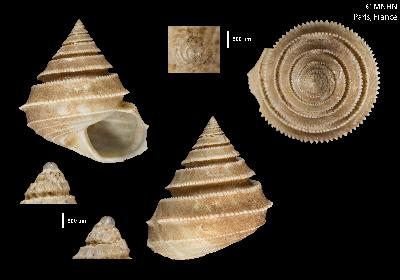

Scientific classification
- Kingdom: Animalia
- Phylum: Mollusca
- Class: Gastropoda
- Subclass: Vetigastropoda
- Family: Calliotropidae
- Genus: Calliotropis
- Species: C. excelsior

Binomial name
- Calliotropis excelsior Vilvens, 2004

Synonyms
- Calliotropis (Solaricida) excelsior Vilvens, 2004

= Calliotropis excelsior =

Species of gastropod

Calliotropis excelsior is a species of sea snail, a marine gastropod mollusk in the family Eucyclidae.

== Description ==
The shell can grow to a length of 24 mm.

== Distribution ==
This species occurs in the Pacific Ocean off Fiji and New Caledonia.
