= Calliotropis stellaris =

Scientific classification
- Kingdom: Animalia
- Phylum: Mollusca
- Class: Gastropoda
- Subclass: Vetigastropoda
- Family: Calliotropidae
- Genus: Calliotropis
- Species: C. stellaris

Binomial name
- Calliotropis stellaris Lee & Wu, 2001

Species of gastropod

Calliotropis stellaris is a species of sea snail, a marine gastropod mollusk in the family Eucyclidae.

== Distribution ==
This marine species occurs off the Philippines.
