= Calliotropis reticulina =

Scientific classification
- Kingdom: Animalia
- Phylum: Mollusca
- Class: Gastropoda
- Subclass: Vetigastropoda
- Family: Calliotropidae
- Genus: Calliotropis
- Species: C. reticulina

Binomial name
- Calliotropis reticulina (Dall, 1895)

Species of gastropod

Calliotropis reticulina is a species of sea snail, a marine gastropod mollusk in the family Eucyclidae.

== Description ==
The shell can grow to be 7 mm in length.

== Distribution ==
It can be found off of the coast of Hawaii.
