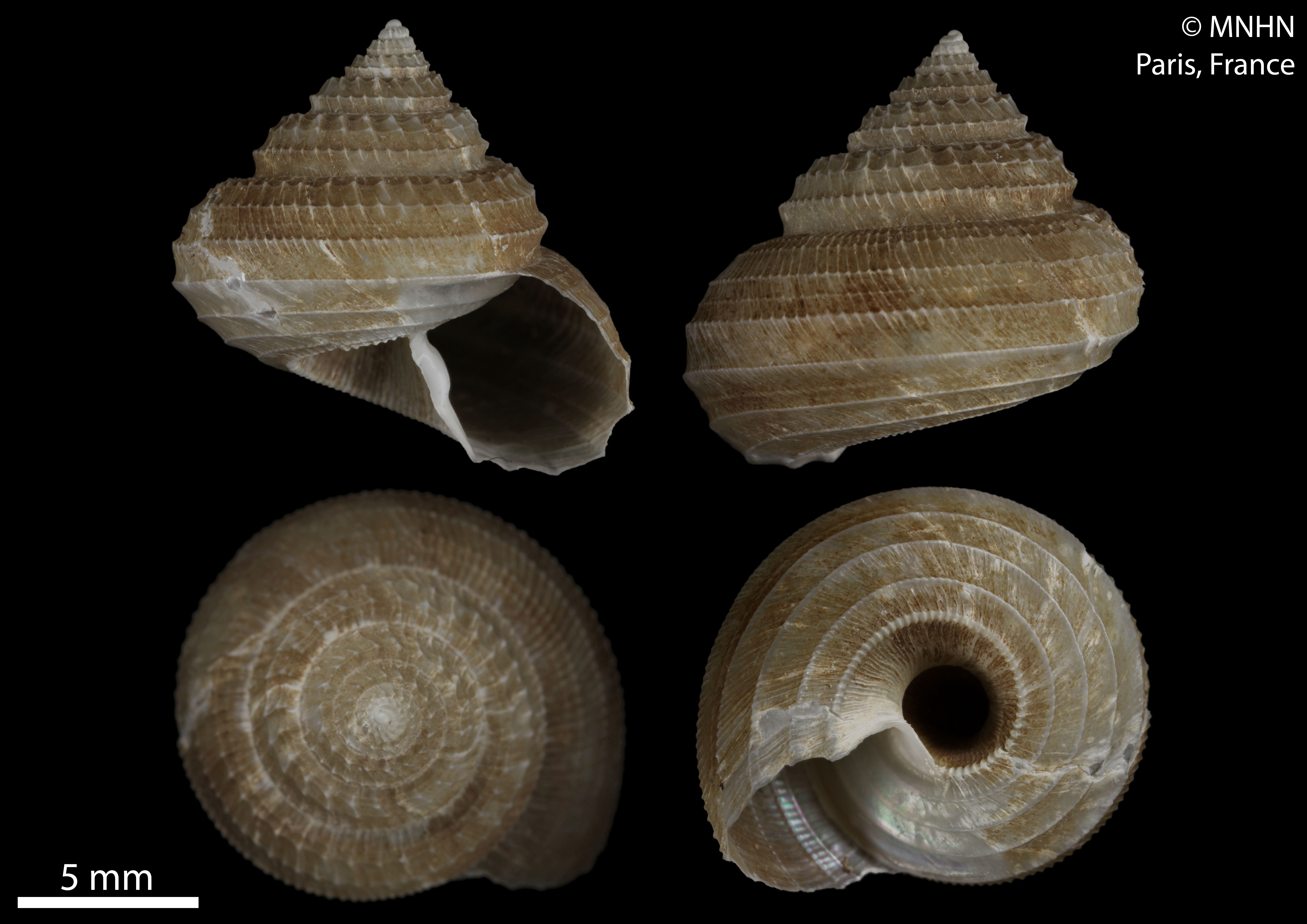
- Shell of Calliotropis hataii (specimen at MNHN, Paris)

Scientific classification
- Kingdom: Animalia
- Phylum: Mollusca
- Class: Gastropoda
- Subclass: Vetigastropoda
- Family: Calliotropidae
- Genus: Calliotropis
- Species: C. hataii

Binomial name
- Calliotropis hataii Rehder & Ladd, 1973

= Calliotropis hataii =

Species of gastropod

Calliotropis hataii is a species of sea snail, a marine gastropod mollusk in the family Eucyclidae.

== Description ==
The length of the shell attains 10 mm.

== Distribution ==
This marine species is found on the Mid-Pacific seamounts and off Wallis and Futuna.
