= Calliotropis eltanini =

Scientific classification
- Kingdom: Animalia
- Phylum: Mollusca
- Class: Gastropoda
- Subclass: Vetigastropoda
- Family: Calliotropidae
- Genus: Calliotropis
- Species: C. eltanini

Binomial name
- Calliotropis eltanini Dell, 1990

Species of gastropod

Calliotropis eltanini is a species of sea snail, a marine gastropod mollusk in the family Eucyclidae.

== Description ==
The length of the shell reaches 14.1 mm.

== Distribution ==
This species occurs off the South Shetland Islands at a depth of 900 m.
