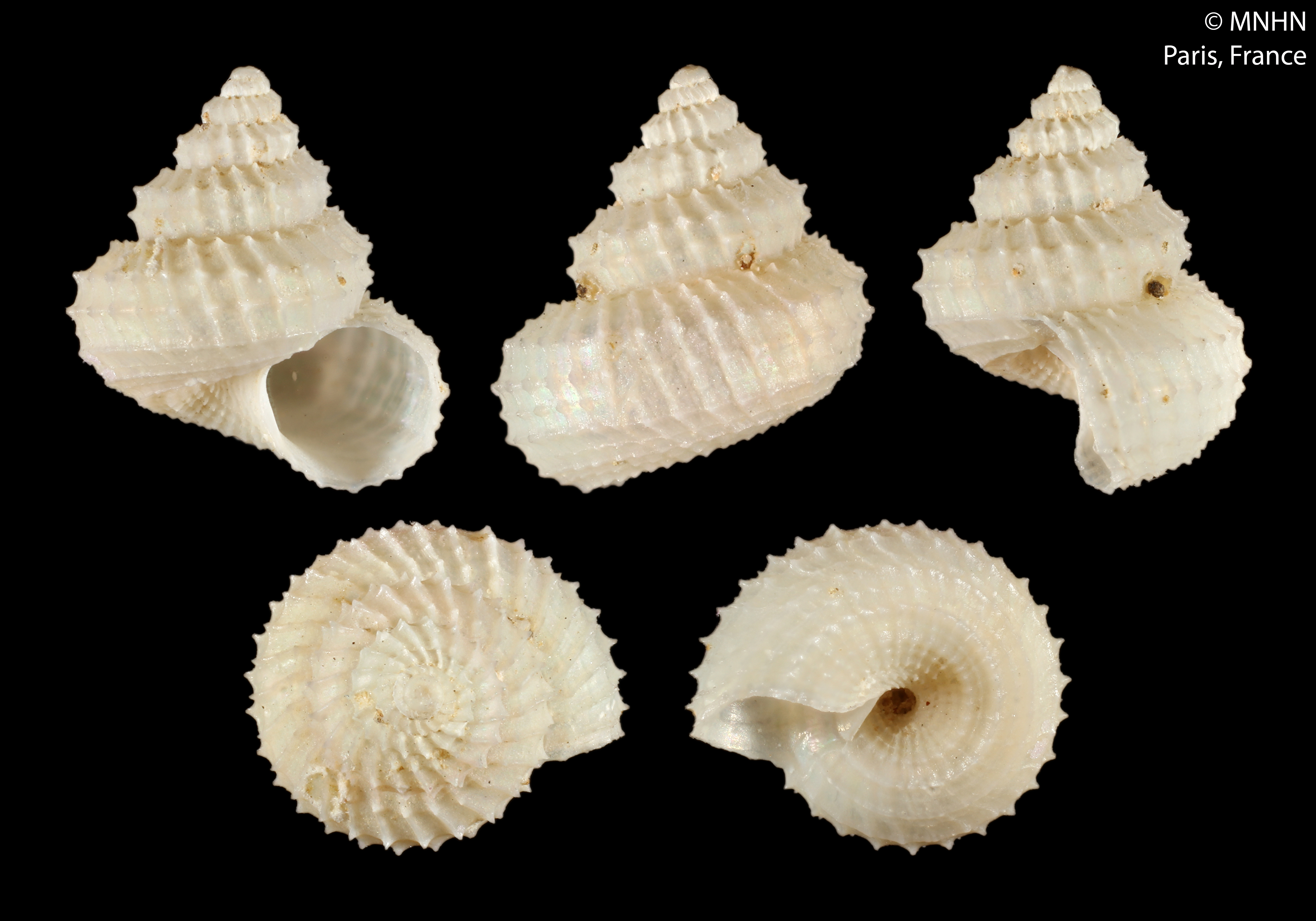

Scientific classification
- Kingdom: Animalia
- Phylum: Mollusca
- Class: Gastropoda
- Subclass: Vetigastropoda
- Family: Calliotropidae
- Genus: Spinicalliotropis
- Species: S. ericius

Binomial name
- Spinicalliotropis ericius (Vilvens, 2006)

Synonyms
- Calliotropis ericius Vilvens, 2006 (original combination)

= Spinicalliotropis ericius =

Species of gastropod

Spinicalliotropis ericius is a species of sea snail, a marine gastropod mollusk in the family Eucyclidae.

== Description ==
The shell can grow to be 4.7 mm.

== Distribution ==
It can be found in the Mozambique Channel and the French island of Réunion.
