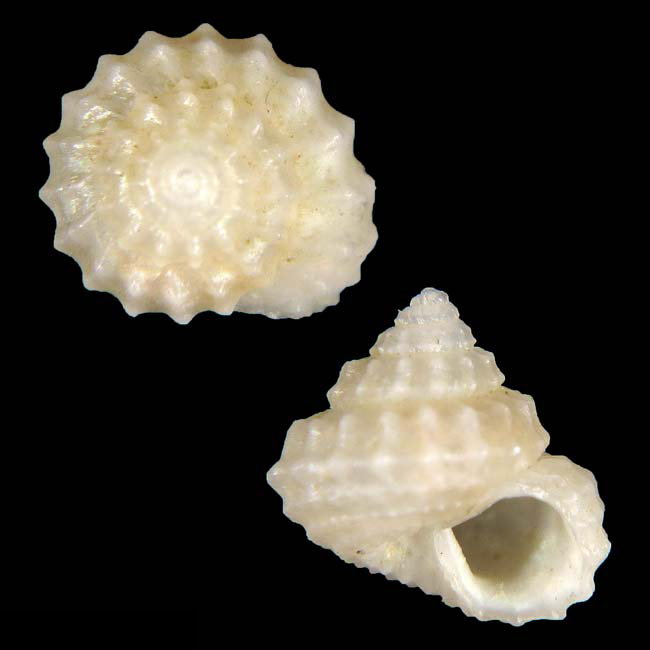
- Shell of Calliotropis malapascuensis

Scientific classification
- Kingdom: Animalia
- Phylum: Mollusca
- Class: Gastropoda
- Subclass: Vetigastropoda
- Superfamily: Seguenzioidea
- Family: Calliotropidae
- Genus: Calliotropis
- Species: C. malapascuensis

Binomial name
- Calliotropis malapascuensis Poppe, Tagaro & Dekker, 2006

Synonyms
- Calliotropis (Adamsenida) malapascuensis Poppe, Tagaro & Dekker, 2006

= Calliotropis malapascuensis =

Species of gastropod

Calliotropis malapascuensis is a species of sea snail, a marine gastropod mollusk in the family Eucyclidae.

== Description ==
The size of the shell varies between 4.4 mm and 5 mm.

== Distribution ==
This marine species occurs off the Philippines.
