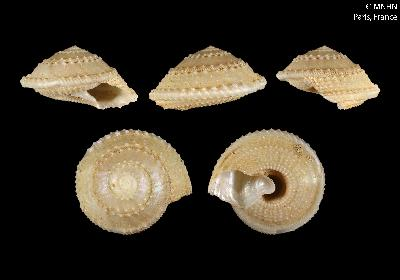

Scientific classification
- Kingdom: Animalia
- Phylum: Mollusca
- Class: Gastropoda
- Subclass: Vetigastropoda
- Family: Calliotropidae
- Genus: Calliotropis
- Species: C. nomismasimilis

Binomial name
- Calliotropis nomismasimilis Vilvens, 2007

= Calliotropis nomismasimilis =

Species of gastropod

Calliotropis nomismasimilis is a species of sea snail, a marine gastropod mollusk in the family Eucyclidae.

== Description ==
The size of the shell varies between 4 mm and 8 mm.

The shell of the Calliotropis nomismasimilis is small for the genus, up to 5.2 mm in height and 9.1 mm in width, much broader than high and cyrtoconoidal (approaching a cone in shape, but with convex sides). The spire is depressed, its height about 0.5–0.6× the shell width (≈4.1- 4.7× the aperture height). The umbilicus is broad.

The protoconch is 280–300 μm, of one whorl, without a terminal varix. The teleoconch has up to 4.8 whorls: early whorls are moderately convex and later whorls slightly concave. Two granular spiral cords are present on the first whorls and three on the last whorls. Primary axial sculpture occurs only on the first whorls. The suture is deeply grooved longitudinally.

=== Whorls ===
First teleoconch whorl: about 20 slightly prosocline smooth ribs with interspaces 2-2.5× rib width; granular cords P1 and P3 appear almost immediately, with nodules at rib intersections; P3 is slightly stronger.

Second whorl: beads on both cords become stronger and sharper, thicker on P3; axial ribs weaken.

Third whorl: beads of P1 and P3 broaden and are bluntly sharp; spacing between beads ≈2× bead size; P4 emerges from the suture mid-whorl, lamellose, with scaly beads that are smaller and about six times more numerous than P3 nodules; P2 is absent; axial ribs disappear.

Fourth whorl: P1 beads are nearly vertical; P4 fully emerges, leaving no gap with P3; P4 beads are smaller than P1, bluntly sharp, scaly.

Last whorl: P4 becomes peripheral and forms a keel; its beads are vertically elongated and about three times more numerous than P3 nodules; two, sometimes three, granular tertiary cords appear after mid-whorl between P1 and P3.

The aperture is imperfectly quadrangular. The outer lip is thin with a submedian angle aligned with external P3–P4 and meets the inner lip at about 120°. The columella is oblique, curved in its anterior third, bears one basal tooth, and expands into the umbilicus. The base is moderately convex with an outer smooth zone and six closely spaced granular spiral cords; spacing is about half a cord's width. The innermost cord is strongest and borders the umbilicus; stout axial ribs connect the beads of the cords. The umbilicus is wide (≈30% of shell width), deep, and tunnel-shaped, with steep walls, crowded weak axial riblets, and no internal spiral cord. The teleoconch and protoconch are hazel-beige in colour.

== Distribution ==
This species occurs in the Pacific Ocean off the Solomon Islands.
