= Calliotropis echidna =

Scientific classification
- Kingdom: Animalia
- Phylum: Mollusca
- Class: Gastropoda
- Subclass: Vetigastropoda
- Family: Calliotropidae
- Genus: Calliotropis
- Species: C. echidna

Binomial name
- Calliotropis echidna Jansen, 1994

Species of gastropod

Calliotropis echidna is a species of sea snail, a marine gastropod mollusk in the family Eucyclidae.

== Description ==
The shell can grow to be 6 mm in length.

== Distribution ==
This marine species occurs in the Arafura Sea, and off New Caledonia and East Australia at depths between 115 m and 229 m.
