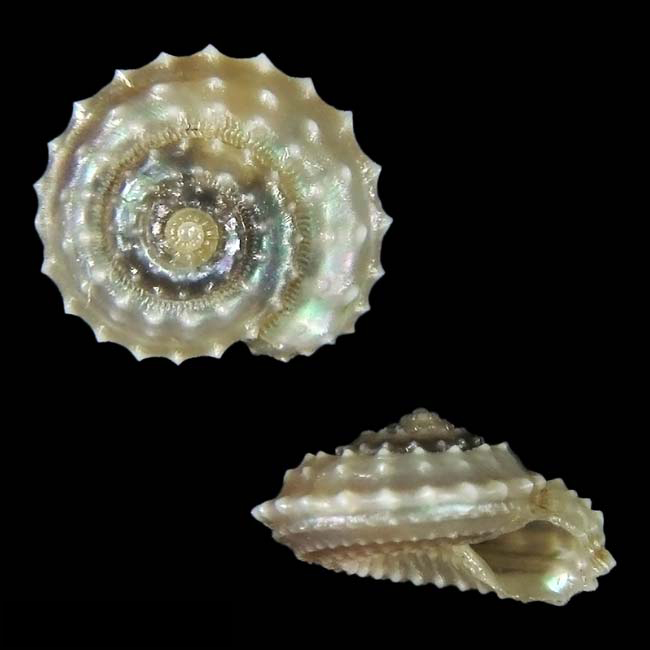

Scientific classification
- Kingdom: Animalia
- Phylum: Mollusca
- Class: Gastropoda
- Subclass: Vetigastropoda
- Family: Calliotropidae
- Genus: Calliotropis
- Species: C. vilvensi

Binomial name
- Calliotropis vilvensi Poppe, Tagaro & Dekker, 2006

Synonyms
- Calliotropis (Adamsenida) vilvensi Poppe, Tagaro & Dekker, 2006

= Calliotropis vilvensi =

Species of gastropod

Calliotropis vilvensi is a species of sea snail, a marine gastropod mollusk in the family Eucyclidae.

== Description ==
The height of the shell is 5 mm.

== Distribution ==
This marine species occurs off the Philippines;
