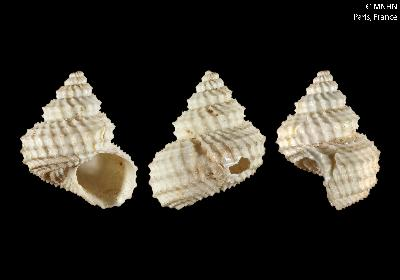

Scientific classification
- Kingdom: Animalia
- Phylum: Mollusca
- Class: Gastropoda
- Subclass: Vetigastropoda
- Family: Calliotropidae
- Genus: Spinicalliotropis
- Species: S. solariellaformis

Binomial name
- Spinicalliotropis solariellaformis (Vilvens, 2006)

Synonyms
- Calliotropis solariellaformis Vilvens, 2006 (original combination)

= Spinicalliotropis solariellaformis =

Species of gastropod

Spinicalliotropis solariellaformis is a species of sea snail, a marine gastropod mollusk in the family Eucyclidae.

== Distribution ==
It can be found off the island Réunion.
