= Calliotropis powelli =

Scientific classification
- Kingdom: Animalia
- Phylum: Mollusca
- Class: Gastropoda
- Subclass: Vetigastropoda
- Family: Calliotropidae
- Genus: Calliotropis
- Species: C. powelli

Binomial name
- Calliotropis powelli Marshall, 1979

Synonyms
- Calliotropis (Calliotropis) powelli Marshall, 1979

Species of gastropod

Calliotropis powelli is a species of sea snail, a marine gastropod mollusk in the family Eucyclidae.

== Distribution ==
This marine species is found off the Kermadec Islands.
