= Calliotropis chuni =

Scientific classification
- Kingdom: Animalia
- Phylum: Mollusca
- Class: Gastropoda
- Subclass: Vetigastropoda
- Family: Calliotropidae
- Genus: Calliotropis
- Species: C. chuni

Binomial name
- Calliotropis chuni (Martens, 1904)

Species of gastropod

Calliotropis chuni is a species of sea snail; a marine gastropod mollusk in the family Eucyclidae.
