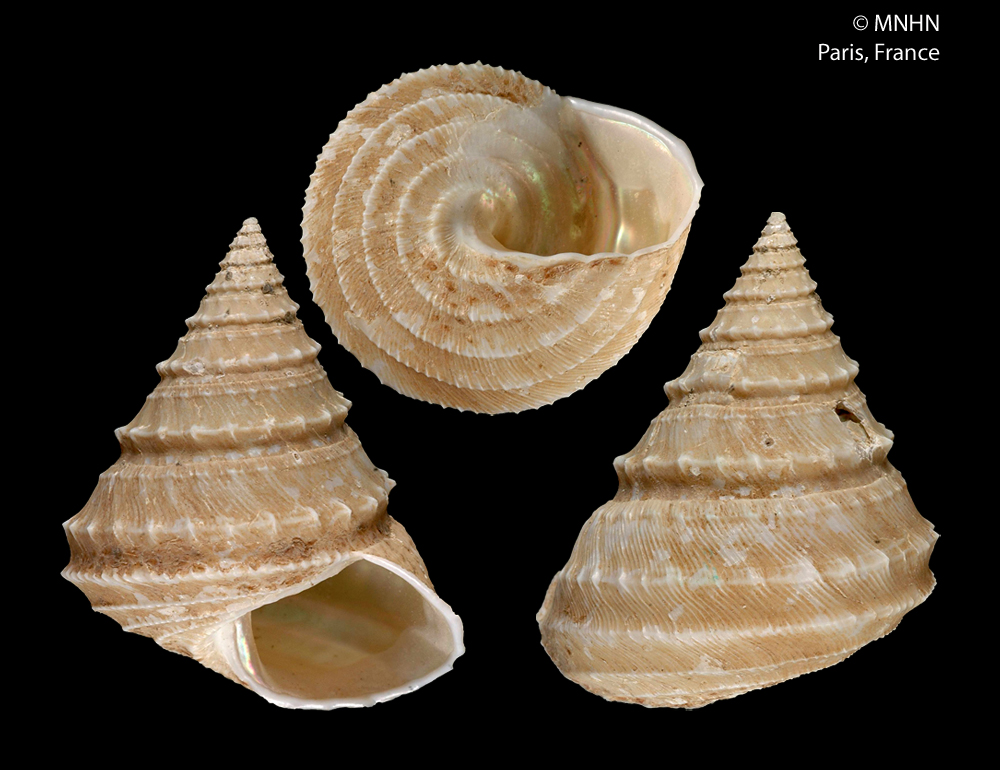

Scientific classification
- Kingdom: Animalia
- Phylum: Mollusca
- Class: Gastropoda
- Subclass: Vetigastropoda
- Family: Calliotropidae
- Genus: Calliotropis
- Species: C. conoeides

Binomial name
- Calliotropis conoeides Vilvens, 2007

= Calliotropis conoeides =

Species of gastropod

Calliotropis conoeides is a species of sea snail, a marine gastropod mollusc in the family Eucyclidae.

== Description ==
The shell grows to a height of 32 mm.

== Distribution ==
This species occurs in the Pacific Ocean off the Solomon Islands and Papua New Guinea.
