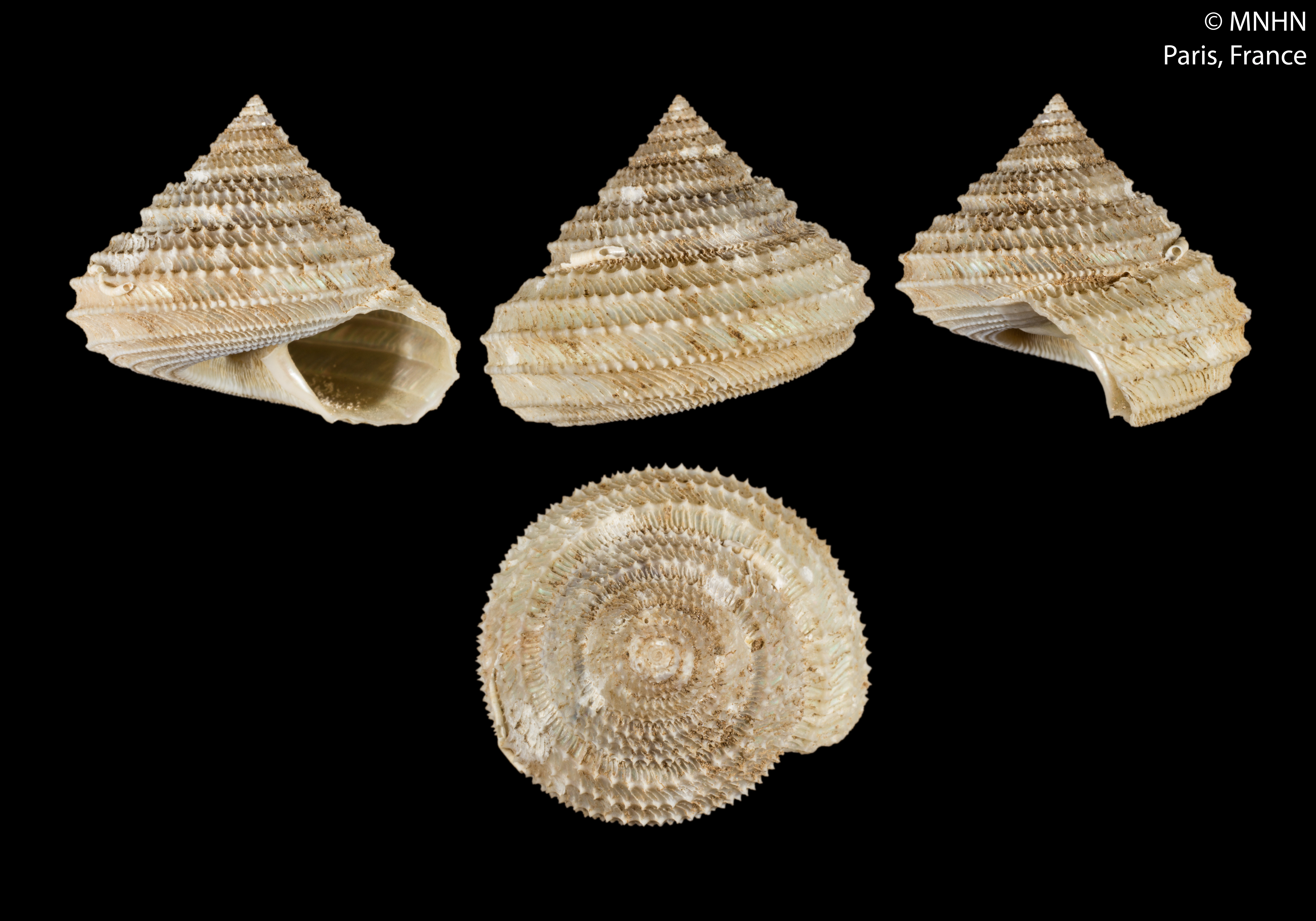

Scientific classification
- Kingdom: Animalia
- Phylum: Mollusca
- Class: Gastropoda
- Subclass: Vetigastropoda
- Family: Calliotropidae
- Genus: Calliotropis
- Species: C. derbiosa

Binomial name
- Calliotropis derbiosa Vilvens, 2004

= Calliotropis derbiosa =

Species of gastropod

Calliotropis derbiosa is a species of sea snail, a marine gastropod mollusk in the family Eucyclidae.

== Description ==
The length of the shell attains 8 mm.

== Distribution ==
This species occurs in the Pacific Ocean off Vanuatu, Fiji and New Caledonia.
