= Calliotropis pelseneeri =

Scientific classification
- Kingdom: Animalia
- Phylum: Mollusca
- Class: Gastropoda
- Subclass: Vetigastropoda
- Family: Calliotropidae
- Genus: Calliotropis
- Species: C. pelseneeri

Binomial name
- Calliotropis pelseneeri Cernohorsky, 1977

Synonyms
- Calliotropis lamellosa Powell, 1958; Margarita lamellosa Pelseneer, 1903; Solariellopis? lamellosa Thiele, 1912

Species of gastropod

Calliotropis pelseneeri is a species of sea snail, a marine gastropod mollusk in the family Eucyclidae.

== Subspecies ==
- Calliotropis pelseneeri pelseneeri Cernohorsky, 1977
- Calliotropis pelseneeri rossiana Dell, 1990 (species inquirenda)

== Description ==
The shell attains a height of 11 mm.

== Distribution ==
This marine species occurs in the Weddell Sea and the Bellingshausen Sea, Antarctica.
