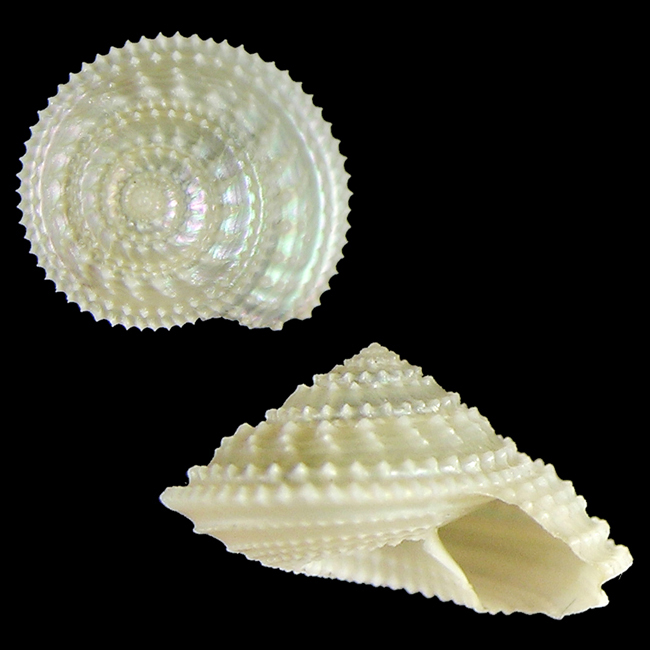

Scientific classification
- Kingdom: Animalia
- Phylum: Mollusca
- Class: Gastropoda
- Subclass: Vetigastropoda
- Family: Calliotropidae
- Genus: Calliotropis
- Species: C. virginiae

Binomial name
- Calliotropis virginiae Poppe, Tagaro & Dekker, 2006

Synonyms
- Calliotropis (Schepmanotropis) virginiae Poppe, Tagaro & Dekker, 2006

= Calliotropis virginiae =

Species of gastropod

Calliotropis virginiae is a species of sea snail, a marine gastropod mollusk in the family Eucyclidae.

== Description ==
The size of the shell varies between 6 mm and 10 mm. It has a noticeable umbilicus and a luminous shell. It has spiral rows with tubercles.

== Distribution ==
This marine species occurs off the Philippines.
