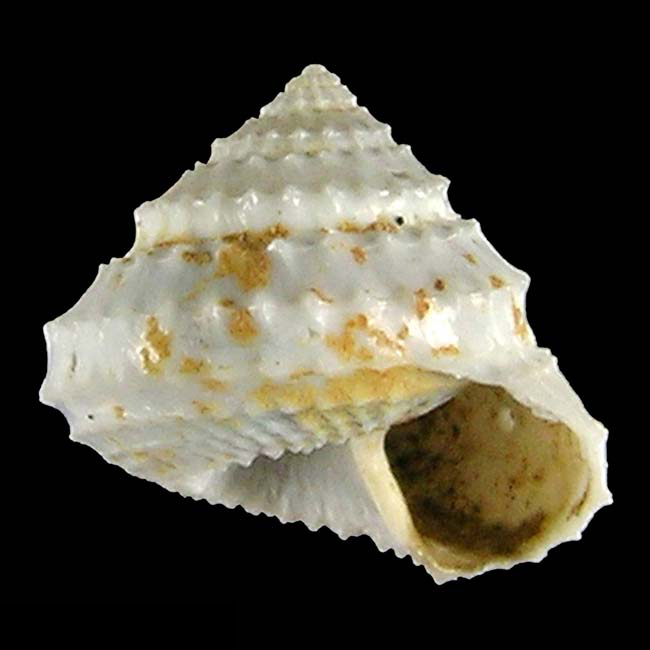

Scientific classification
- Kingdom: Animalia
- Phylum: Mollusca
- Class: Gastropoda
- Subclass: Vetigastropoda
- Family: Calliotropidae
- Genus: Calliotropis
- Species: C. francocacii

Binomial name
- Calliotropis francocacii Poppe, Tagaro & Dekker, 2006

Synonyms
- Calliotropis (Solaricida) francocacii Poppe, Tagaro & Dekker, 2006

= Calliotropis francocacii =

Species of gastropod

Calliotropis francocacii is a species of sea snail, a marine gastropod mollusk in the family Eucyclidae.

== Description ==
The size of the shell varies 5.7 mm and 6.3 mm.It s a type of sea shell.

It's used a food. They are distributed mainly in Western Central Pacific: Philippines. They are very hard to find.

== Distribution ==
This marine species occurs off the Philippines.
