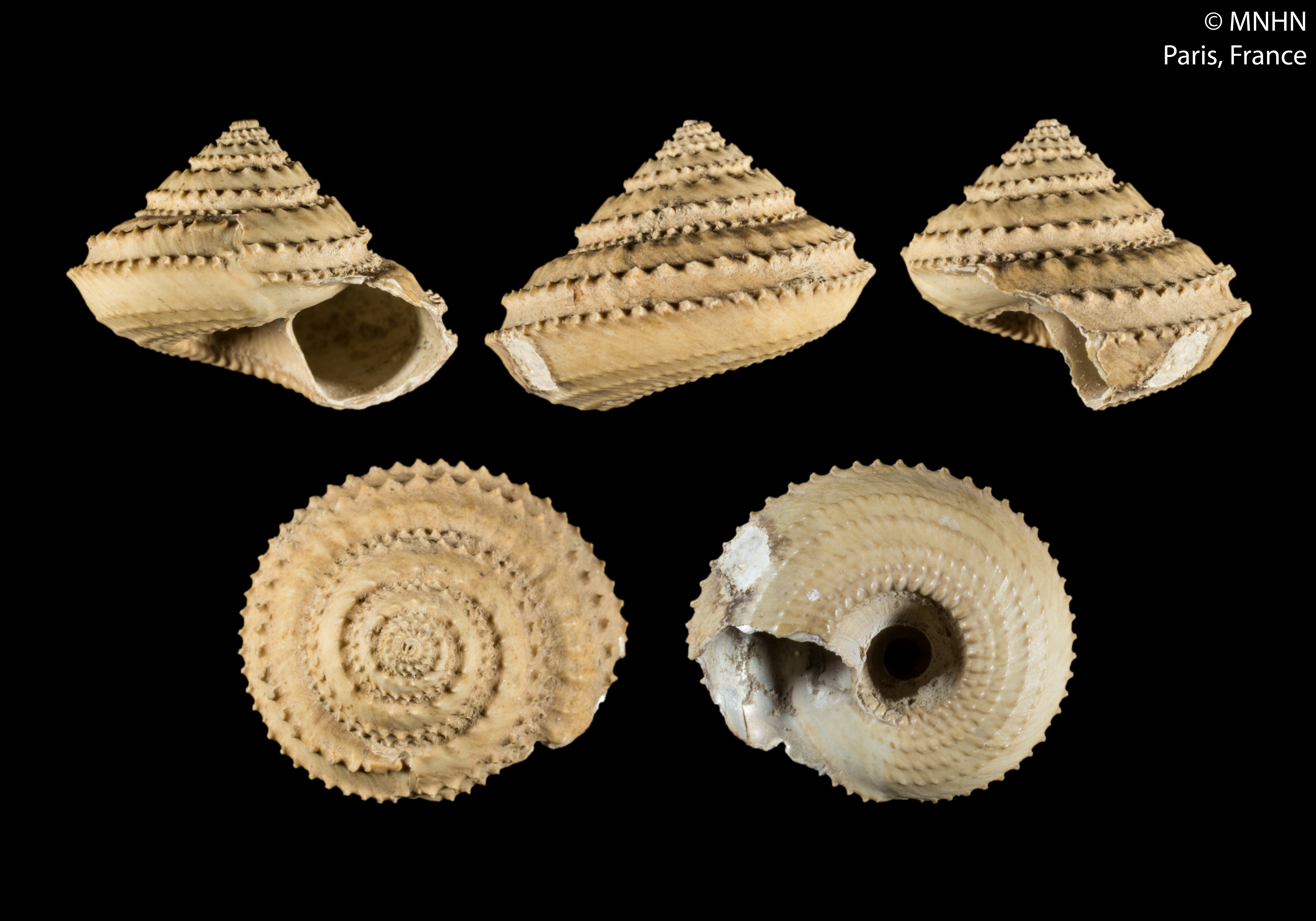
- Shell of Calliotropis boucheti (holotype at MNHN, Paris)

Scientific classification
- Kingdom: Animalia
- Phylum: Mollusca
- Class: Gastropoda
- Subclass: Vetigastropoda
- Superfamily: Seguenzioidea
- Family: Calliotropidae
- Genus: Calliotropis
- Species: C. boucheti

Binomial name
- Calliotropis boucheti Poppe, Tagaro & Dekker, 2006

Synonyms
- Calliotropis (Adamsenida) boucheti Poppe, G.T., S.P. Tagaro & H. Dekker, 2006

= Calliotropis boucheti =

Species of gastropod

Calliotropis boucheti is a species of sea snail, a marine gastropod mollusk in the family Eucyclidae.

== Description ==
The length of the shell varies between 6 mm and 15 mm.

== Distribution ==
This marine species occurs off the Philippines.
