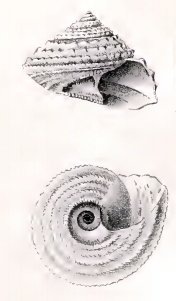
- Original drawing with two views of a shell of Calliotropis patula

Scientific classification
- Kingdom: Animalia
- Phylum: Mollusca
- Class: Gastropoda
- Subclass: Vetigastropoda
- Family: Calliotropidae
- Genus: Calliotropis
- Species: C. patula

Binomial name
- Calliotropis patula (Martens, 1904)

Synonyms
- Basilissa patula Watson, 1878

= Calliotropis patula =

Species of gastropod

Calliotropis patula is a species of sea snail, a marine gastropod mollusk in the family Eucyclidae.

== Description ==
The size of the shell varies between 20 mm and 28 mm.

== Distribution ==
This species occurs in the Indian Ocean off Madagascar and Mozambique.
