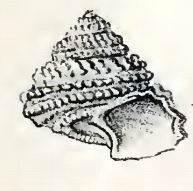
- Drawing with an apertural view of a shell of Calliotropis glypta

Scientific classification
- Kingdom: Animalia
- Phylum: Mollusca
- Class: Gastropoda
- Subclass: Vetigastropoda
- Family: Calliotropidae
- Genus: Calliotropis
- Species: C. glypta

Binomial name
- Calliotropis glypta (Watson, 1886)

Synonyms
- Gibbula glyptus Watson, 1886; Trochus (Gibbula) glyptus Watson, 1886

= Calliotropis glypta =

Species of gastropod

Calliotropis glypta is a species of sea snail, a marine gastropod mollusk in the family Eucyclidae.

== Description ==
The size of the shell varies between 20–27 millimetres (0.79–1.06 in).

Sculpture, spirals: a flat shoulder below the suture is followed by an angulation, on and below there is a double row of smallish, round but pointed tubercles. These are remote from one another but run in pairs on the two rows. The tubercles in each row are connected by a slight rounded thread. On the second, third and fourth whorls these rows coalesce into one. On the body whorl they are slightly apart. At the periphery is a strong angulation bearing a sharp carina. Just above this is a spiral thread, which, as well as the carina, is ornamented with delicate, sharp, laterally compressed beads separated from one another by about twice their own size. Those on the upper spiral are rather the larger. The middle of the whorl for about 0.25 cm is bare. On the base there are five closely beaded threads, of which the inmost and strongest defines the umbilicus. Between the outermost and the carina is a broad slightly sunken furrow. The carina meets the outer lip and appears above the suture.

Longitudinals: The upper whorls are ribbed, but the ribbing gradually breaks into the double row of paired tubercles, and the link uniting the pairs in the two rows becomes very feeble. There are besides many distant, irregular, loose, skin-like puckerings which follow the lines of growth. They disappear on the spiral threads. The whole surface is further roughened by microscopic flexuous wrinklings.

The color of the shell is yellowish white on the thin calcareous layer overlying the nacre. The high spire is a little scalar. The apex is small and sharp. The eight whorls increase regularly in size. They are a little rounded, angulated at the carina, rather tumid on the base, and have a wide umbilicus. The suture is angulated and well defined, but a little filled up by the carina of the overlying whorl. The aperture is (apparently) perpendicular and semioval. The outer lip is well rounded. The columellar lip is a little bent over on the umbilicus, and then advancing rather straight toward the left. it is angulated and slightly toothed at the point of the base when the umbilical beaded thread joins it. The umbilicus has a wide deep funnel, with a deep spiral staircase at the junction of the whorls.

== Distribution ==
This marine species occurs off Queensland and New South Wales, Australia; also off Vanuatu.
