= Calliotropis rhysa =

Scientific classification
- Kingdom: Animalia
- Phylum: Mollusca
- Class: Gastropoda
- Subclass: Vetigastropoda
- Superfamily: Seguenzioidea
- Family: Calliotropidae
- Genus: Calliotropis
- Species: C. rhysa

Binomial name
- Calliotropis rhysa (Watson, 1879)

Synonyms
- Trochus (Margarita) rhysus Watson, 1879 (original combination); Trochus rhysus Watson, 1879

Species of gastropod

Calliotropis rhysa is a species of sea snail, a marine gastropod mollusk in the family Eucyclidae.

== Description ==
The length of the shell attains 6.5 mm.

== Distribution ==
This marine species is found off Sombrero Island, Antigua.
