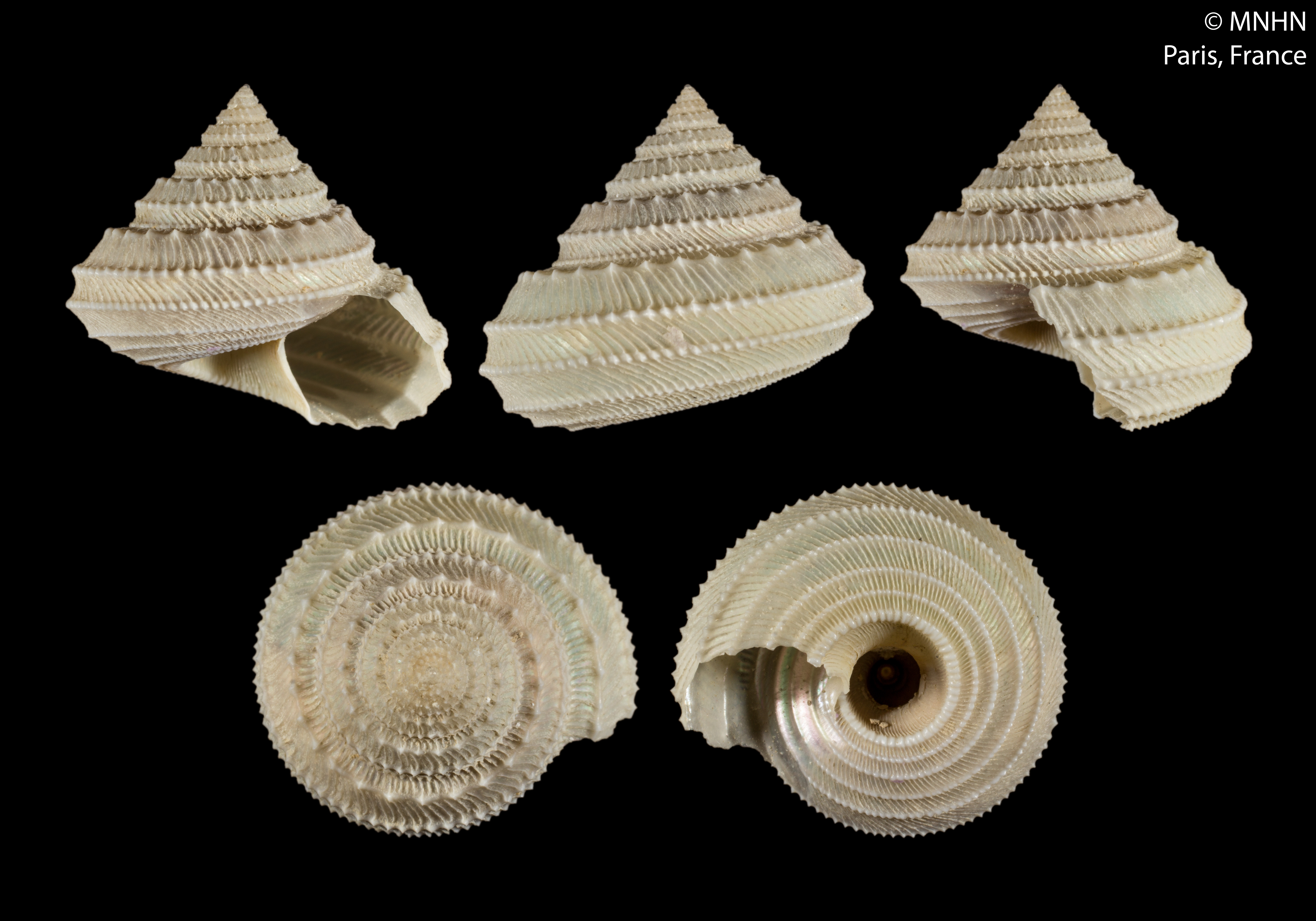
- Shell of Calliotropis micraulax (holotype at MNHN, Paris)

Scientific classification
- Kingdom: Animalia
- Phylum: Mollusca
- Class: Gastropoda
- Subclass: Vetigastropoda
- Family: Calliotropidae
- Genus: Calliotropis
- Species: C. micraulax

Binomial name
- Calliotropis micraulax Vilvens, 2004

Synonyms
- Calliotropis (Solaricida) micraulax Vilvens, 2004

= Calliotropis micraulax =

Species of gastropod

Calliotropis micraulax is a species of sea snail, a marine gastropod mollusk in the family Eucyclidae.

== Description ==
The length of the shell reaches 15 mm.

== Distribution ==
This species occurs in the Pacific Ocean off New Caledonia and Vanuatu.
