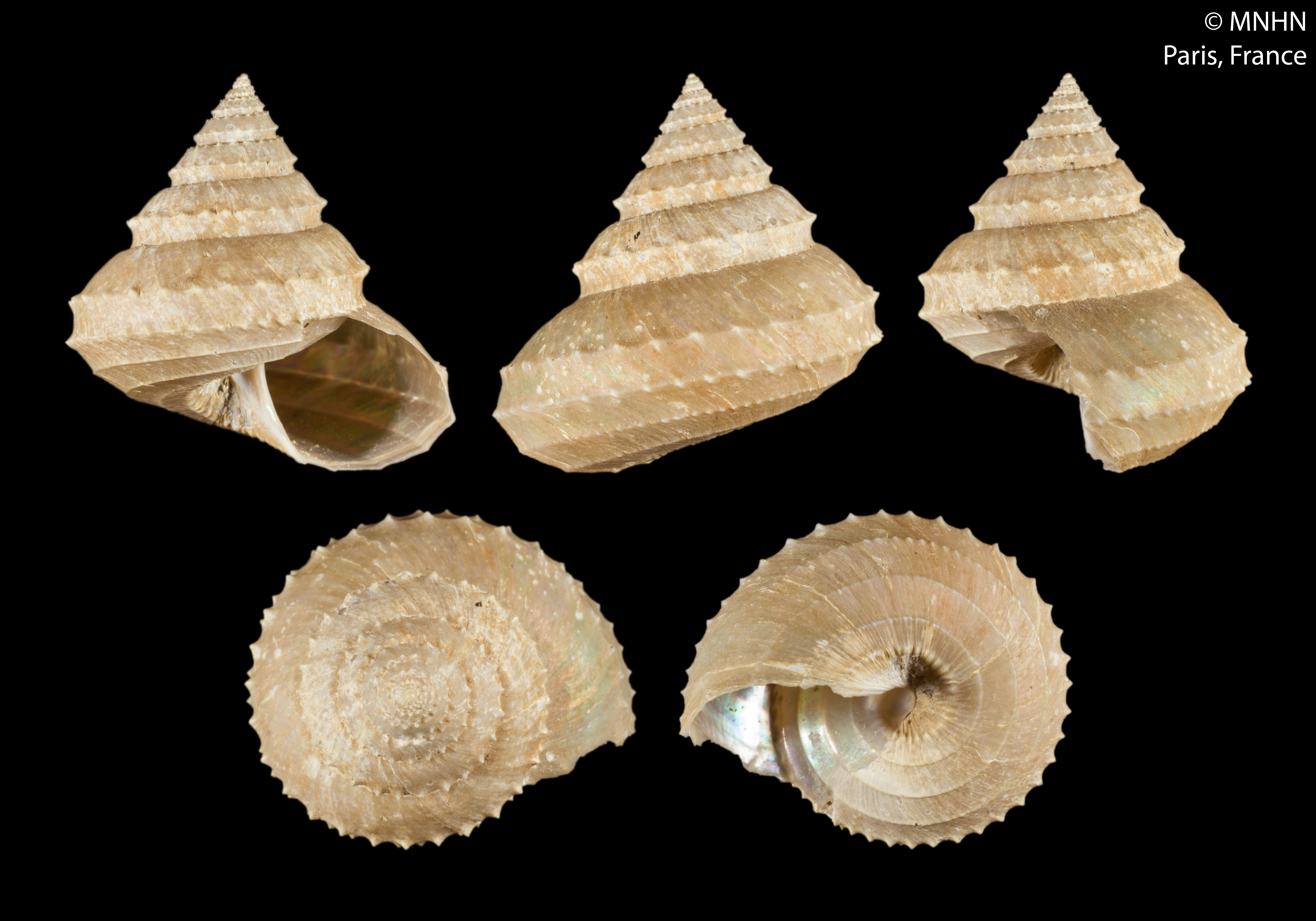
- Shell of Calliotropis philippei (holotype at MNHN, Paris)

Scientific classification
- Kingdom: Animalia
- Phylum: Mollusca
- Class: Gastropoda
- Subclass: Vetigastropoda
- Family: Calliotropidae
- Genus: Calliotropis
- Species: C. philippei

Binomial name
- Calliotropis philippei Poppe, Tagaro & Dekker, 2006

Synonyms
- Calliotropis (Solaricida) philippei Poppe, Tagaro & Dekker, 2006

= Calliotropis philippei =

Species of gastropod

Calliotropis philippei is a species of sea snail, a marine gastropod mollusk in the family Eucyclidae.

== Description ==
The size of the shell varies between 18 mm and 22 mm.

== Distribution ==
This marine species occurs off the Philippines.
