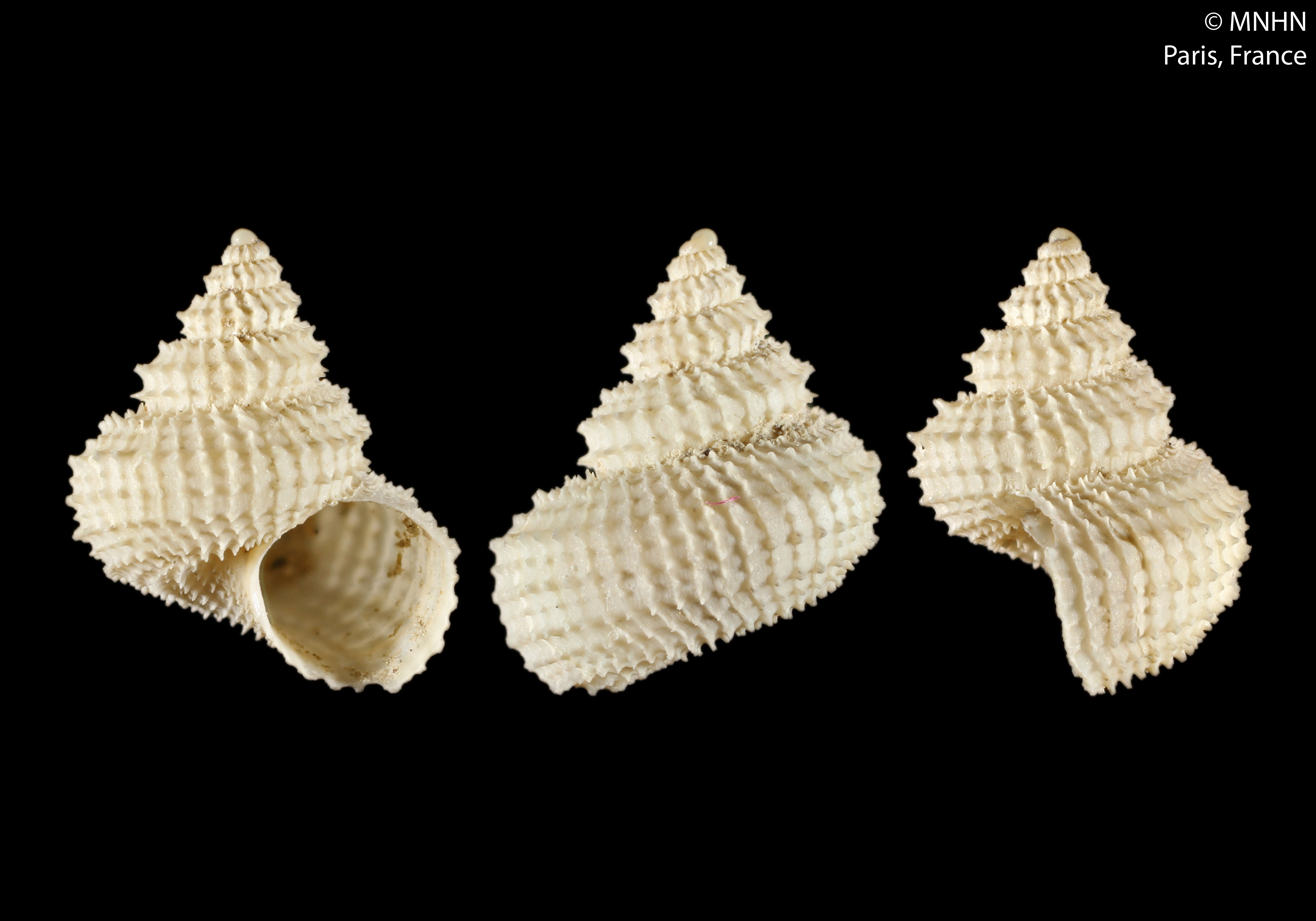
- Shell of Spinicalliotropis spinosa (holotype at MNHN? paris)

Scientific classification
- Kingdom: Animalia
- Phylum: Mollusca
- Class: Gastropoda
- Subclass: Vetigastropoda
- Superfamily: Seguenzioidea
- Family: Calliotropidae
- Genus: Spinicalliotropis
- Species: S. spinosa

Binomial name
- Spinicalliotropis spinosa (Poppe, Tagaro & Dekker, 2006)

Synonyms
- Calliotropis (Spinicalliotropis) spinosa Poppe, Tagaro & Dekker, 2006 (basionym); Calliotropis spinosa Poppe, Tagaro & Dekker, 2006 (original combination)

= Spinicalliotropis spinosa =

Species of gastropod

Spinicalliotropis spinosa is a species of sea snail, a marine gastropod mollusk in the family Eucyclidae.

== Original description ==
- (of Calliotropis spinosa Poppe, Tagaro & Dekker, 2006) Poppe G.T., Tagaro S.P. & Dekker H. (2006) The Seguenziidae, Chilodontidae, Trochidae, Calliostomatidae and Solariellidae of the Philippine Islands. Visaya Supplement 2: 1–228.

== Distribution ==
This marine species occurs off Mindoro Island, the Philippines.
