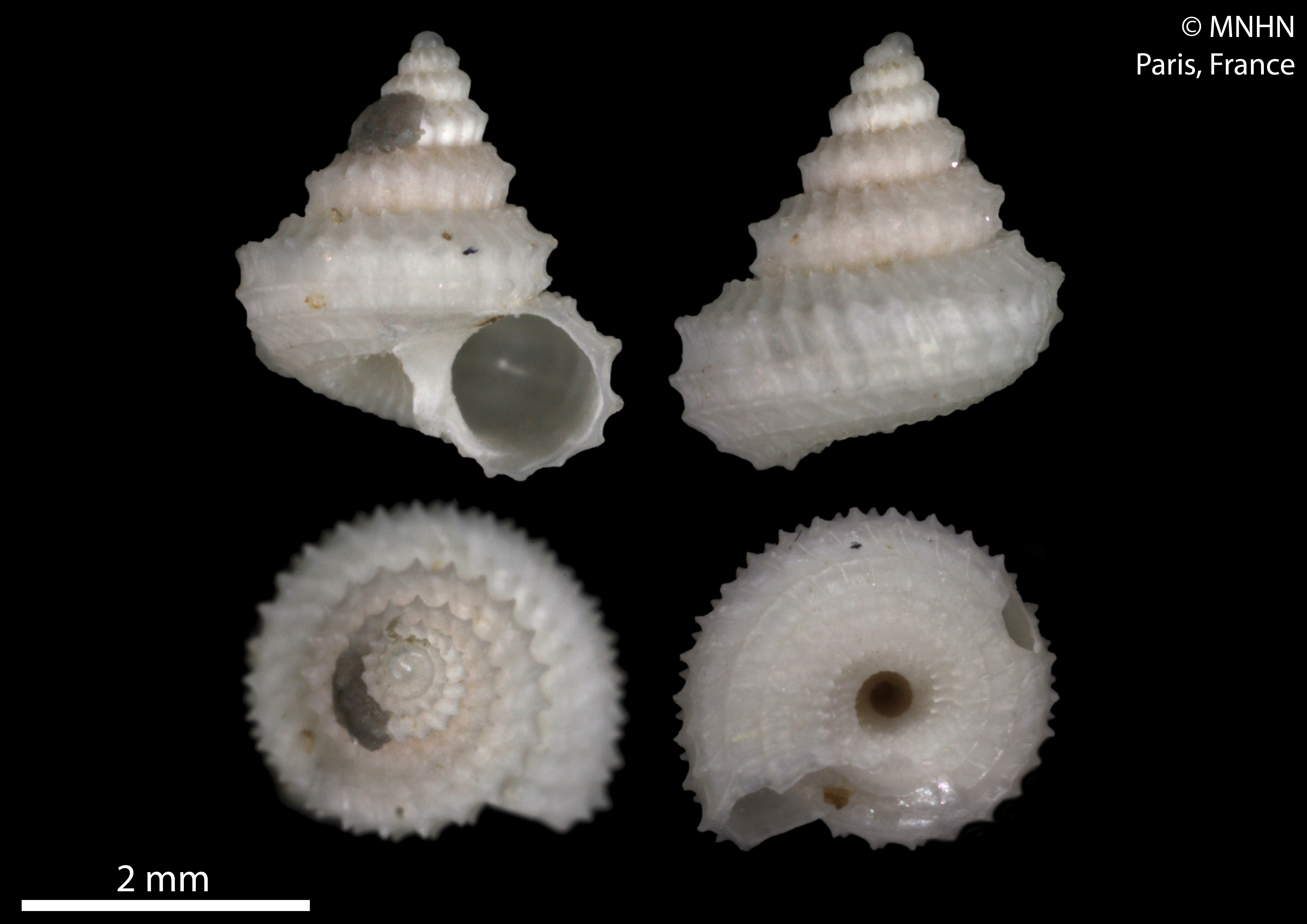
- Shell of Spinicalliotropis lamellifera (specimen at MNHN, Paris)

Scientific classification
- Kingdom: Animalia
- Phylum: Mollusca
- Class: Gastropoda
- Subclass: Vetigastropoda
- Family: Calliotropidae
- Genus: Spinicalliotropis
- Species: S. lamellifera

Binomial name
- Spinicalliotropis lamellifera (Jansen, 1994)

Synonyms
- Calliotropis lamellifera Jansen, 1994 (original combination)

= Spinicalliotropis lamellifera =

Species of gastropod

Spinicalliotropis lamellifera is a species of sea snail, a marine gastropod mollusc in the family Eucyclidae.

== Distribution ==
This marine species occurs off East Australia.
