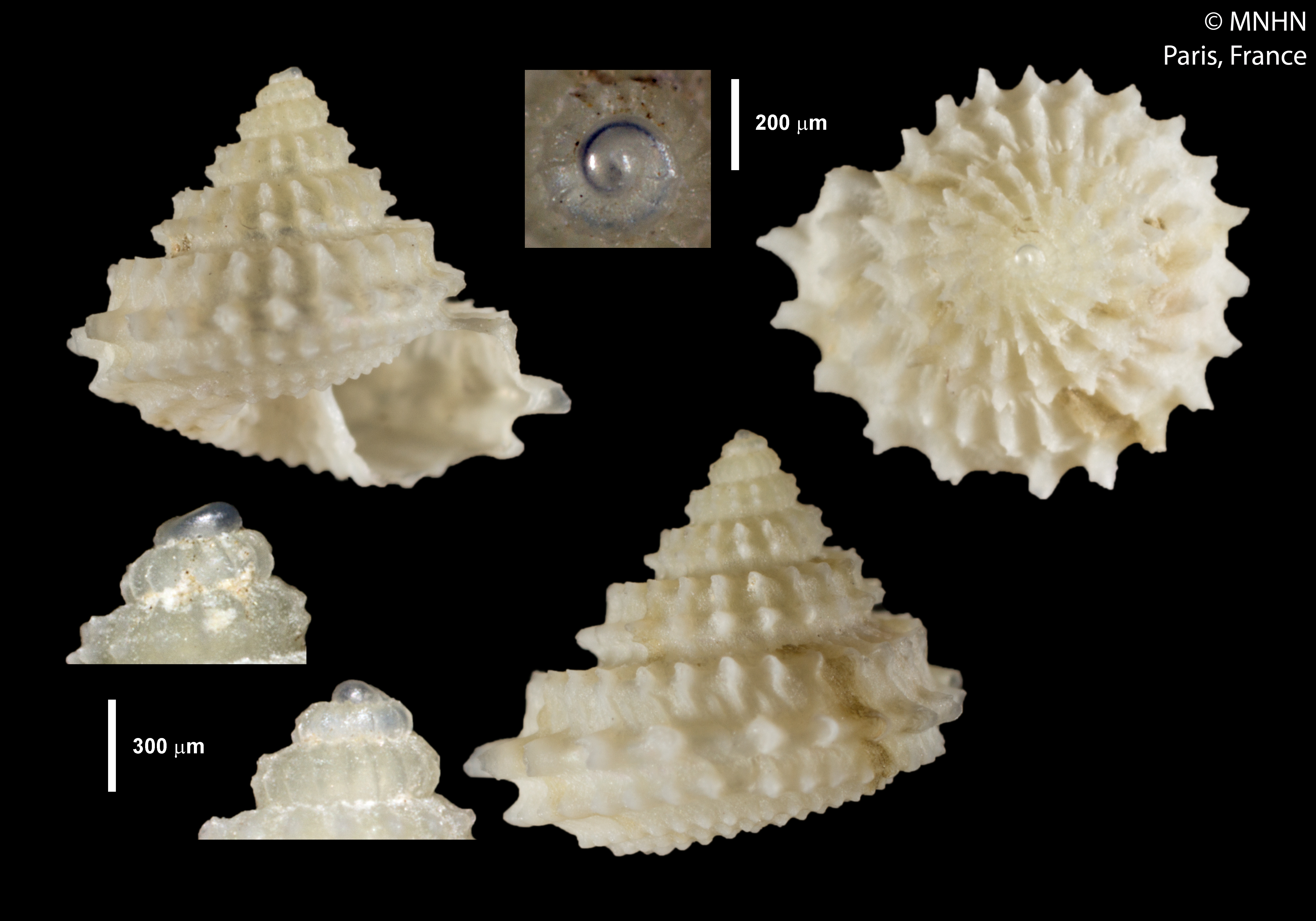
- Shell of Calliotropis pyramoeides (holotype at MNHN, Paris)

Scientific classification
- Kingdom: Animalia
- Phylum: Mollusca
- Class: Gastropoda
- Subclass: Vetigastropoda
- Family: Calliotropidae
- Genus: Calliotropis
- Species: C. pyramoeides

Binomial name
- Calliotropis pyramoeides Vilvens, 2007

= Calliotropis pyramoeides =

Species of gastropod

Calliotropis pyramoeides is a species of sea snail, a marine gastropod mollusk in the family Eucyclidae.

== Description ==
The size of the shell varies between 4 mm and 6 mm, and is broadly conical in shape, globular and finely granulate, with discontinuous spiral ribs. The shell features spiral and axial ribs with spines at intersections. Spines lower on the whorl develop into C-shaped lamellae. The umbilicus is broad and encircled by a rib, with spiral and axial ribs inside.

== Distribution ==
This marine species occurs off New Caledonia.
