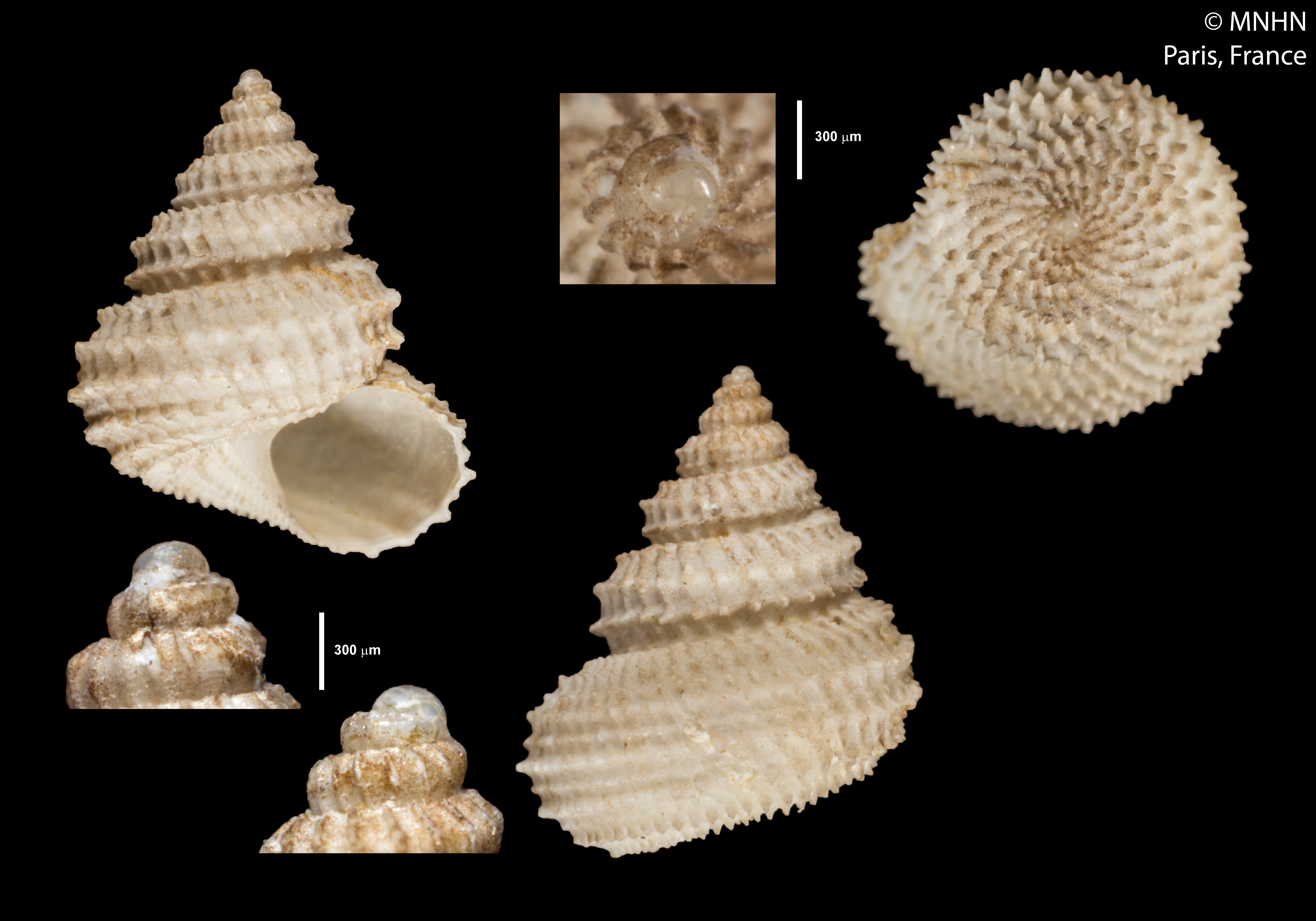

Scientific classification
- Kingdom: Animalia
- Phylum: Mollusca
- Class: Gastropoda
- Subclass: Vetigastropoda
- Family: Calliotropidae
- Genus: Spinicalliotropis
- Species: S. chalkeie

Binomial name
- Spinicalliotropis chalkeie (Vilvens, 2007)

Synonyms
- Calliotropis chalkeie Vilvens, 2007 (original combination)

= Spinicalliotropis chalkeie =

Species of gastropod

Spinicalliotropis chalkeie is a species of sea snail, a marine gastropod mollusc in the family Eucyclidae.

== Description ==
The length of the shell reaches 6.5 mm.

== Distribution ==
This species occurs in the Pacific Ocean off the Solomon Islands, New Caledonia and Fiji.
