= Calliotropis persculpta =

Scientific classification
- Kingdom: Animalia
- Phylum: Mollusca
- Class: Gastropoda
- Subclass: Vetigastropoda
- Family: Calliotropidae
- Genus: Calliotropis
- Species: C. persculpta

Binomial name
- Calliotropis persculpta (G.B. Sowerby III, 1903)

Species of gastropod

Calliotropis persculpta is a species of sea snail, a marine gastropod mollusk in the family Eucyclidae.

== Description ==
The shell can grow up to be 10 mm.

== Distribution ==
This marine species occurs off South Africa.
