= Calliotropis antarctica =

Scientific classification
- Kingdom: Animalia
- Phylum: Mollusca
- Class: Gastropoda
- Subclass: Vetigastropoda
- Family: Calliotropidae
- Genus: Calliotropis
- Species: C. antarctica

Binomial name
- Calliotropis antarctica Dell, 1990

Synonyms
- Calliotropis (Solaricida) antarctica Dell, R.K., 1990

Species of Antarctic sea snail

Calliotropis antarctica is a species of sea snail, a marine gastropod mollusk in the family Eucyclidae.

== Description ==
The size of the shell varies between 8 mm and 10.5 mm.

== Distribution ==
This species occurs in Antarctic waters.
