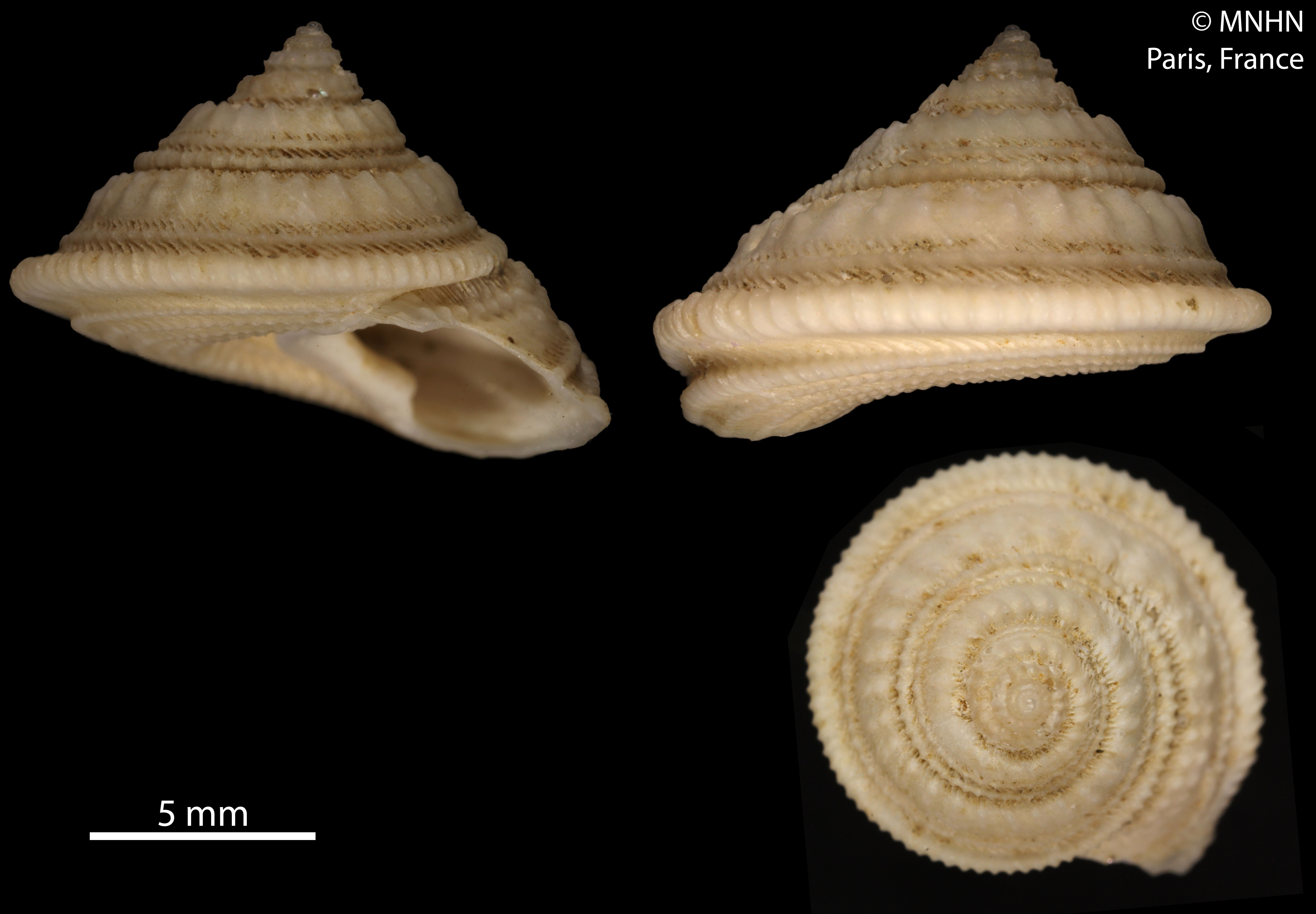
- Shell of Calliotropis eucheloides (specimen at MNHN, Paris)

Scientific classification
- Kingdom: Animalia
- Phylum: Mollusca
- Class: Gastropoda
- Subclass: Vetigastropoda
- Family: Calliotropidae
- Genus: Calliotropis
- Species: C. eucheloides

Binomial name
- Calliotropis eucheloides Marshall, 1979

Synonyms
- Calliotropis (Calliotropis) eucheloides Marshall, 1979

= Calliotropis eucheloides =

Species of gastropod

Calliotropis eucheloides is a species of sea snail, a marine gastropod mollusk in the family Eucyclidae.

== Description ==
The length of the shell reaches 10 mm. The short-shelled form has a series of vertical ridges that run along the edge of the spire (in some subspecies there are several circular ridges on the surface of the shell). The color is mainly cream with a few dark streaks.

== Distribution ==
This marine species occurs off the Philippines, New Caledonia, the Solomon Islands and the Kermadec Islands.
