= Calliotropis galea =

Scientific classification
- Kingdom: Animalia
- Phylum: Mollusca
- Class: Gastropoda
- Subclass: Vetigastropoda
- Family: Calliotropidae
- Genus: Calliotropis
- Species: C. galea

Binomial name
- Calliotropis galea (Habe, 1953)

Synonyms
- Calliotropis (Adamsenida) galea (Habe, T., 1953)

Species of gastropod

Calliotropis galea (or Lischkeia (Adamsenida) galea) is a species of sea snail, a marine gastropod mollusk in the family Eucyclidae.

== Description ==
The length of the shell reaches 11.2 mm.

== Distribution ==
This marine species occurs off the Philippines.
