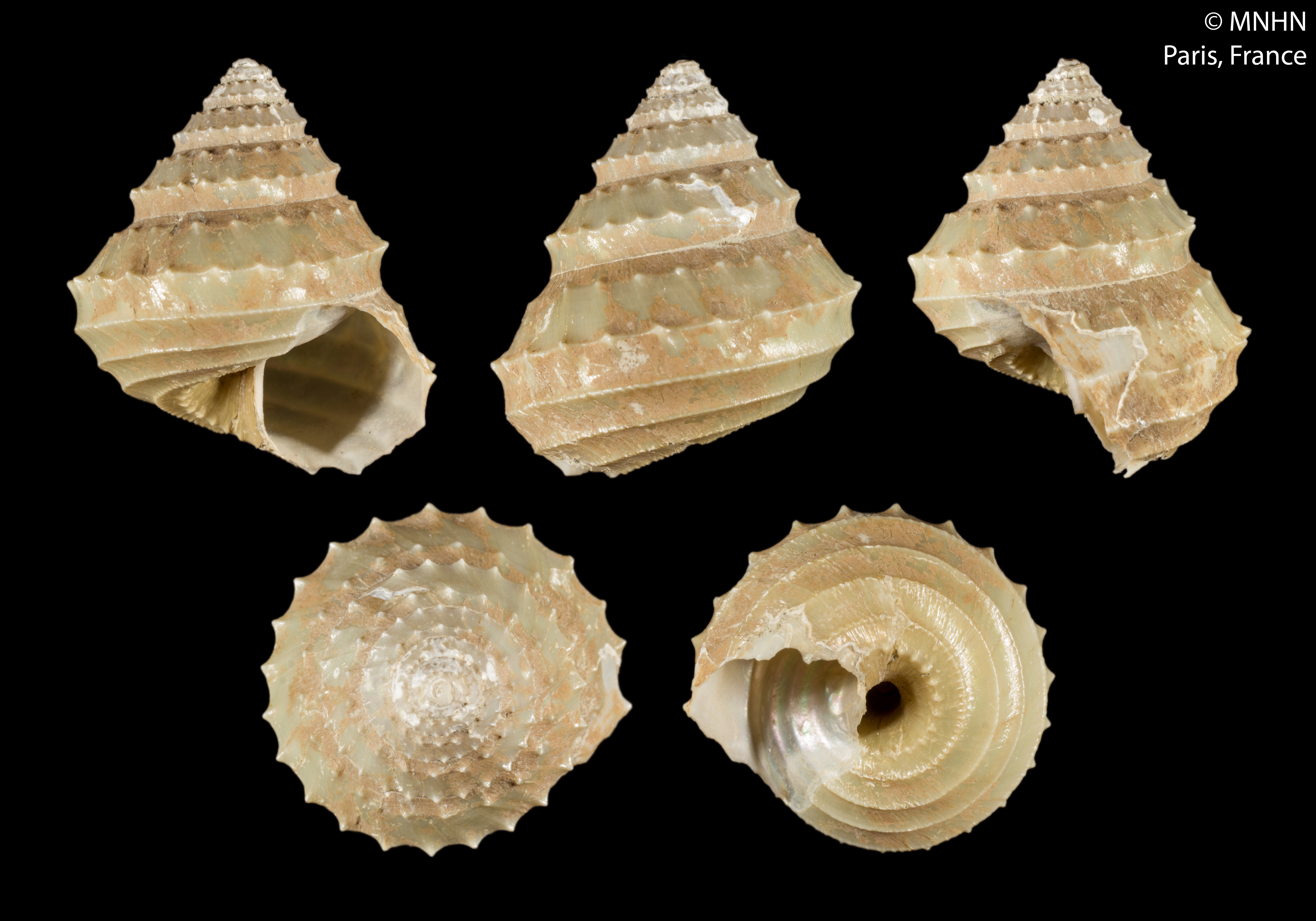
- Shell of Calliotropis minorusaitoi (holotype at MNHN, Paris)

Scientific classification
- Kingdom: Animalia
- Phylum: Mollusca
- Class: Gastropoda
- Subclass: Vetigastropoda
- Family: Calliotropidae
- Genus: Calliotropis
- Species: C. minorusaitoi

Binomial name
- Calliotropis minorusaitoi Poppe, Tagaro & Dekker, 2006

Synonyms
- Calliotropis (Calliotropis) minorusaitoi Poppe, Tagaro & Dekker, 2006; Calliotropis (Solaricida) minorusaitoi Poppe, Tagaro & Dekker, 2006

= Calliotropis minorusaitoi =

Species of gastropod

Calliotropis minorusaitoi is a species of sea snail, a marine gastropod mollusk in the family Eucyclidae.

== Description ==
The shell grows to a length of 21.4 mm.

== Distribution ==
This marine species occurs off the Philippines.
