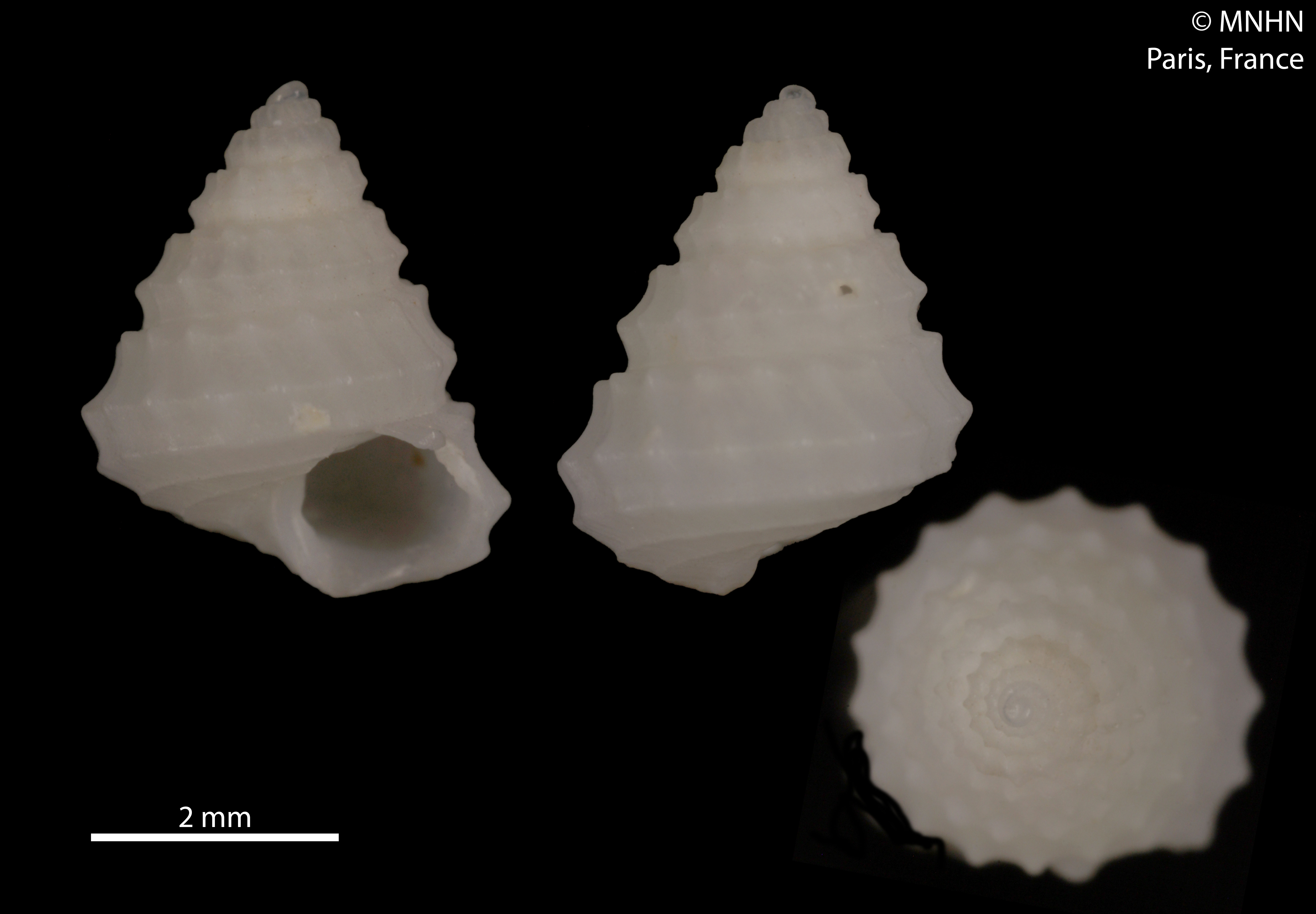
- Shell of Calliotropis acherontis (specimen at MNHN, Paris)

Scientific classification
- Kingdom: Animalia
- Phylum: Mollusca
- Class: Gastropoda
- Subclass: Vetigastropoda
- Family: Calliotropidae
- Genus: Calliotropis
- Species: C. acherontis

Binomial name
- Calliotropis acherontis Marshall, 1979

Synonyms
- Calliotropis (Calliotropis) acherontis Marshall, 1979 (original combination)

= Calliotropis acherontis =

Species of gastropod

Calliotropis acherontis is a species of sea snail, a marine gastropod mollusk in the family Eucyclidae.

== Distribution ==
This marine species occurs off East Australia, New Zealand, the Kermadec Islands and New Caledonia.
