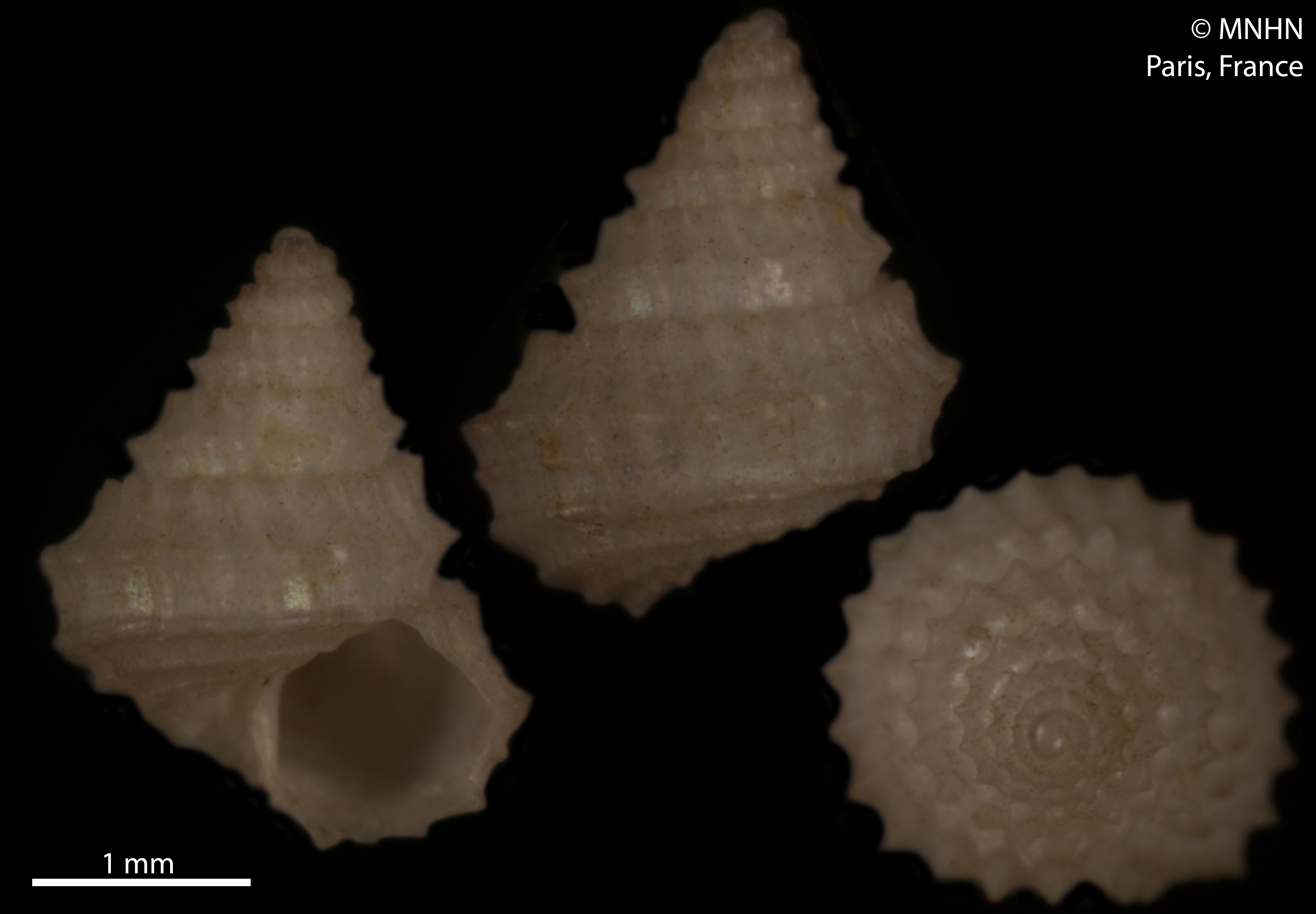
- Shell of Calliotropis crystalophora (specimen at MNHN, Paris)

Scientific classification
- Kingdom: Animalia
- Phylum: Mollusca
- Class: Gastropoda
- Subclass: Vetigastropoda
- Superfamily: Seguenzioidea
- Family: Calliotropidae
- Genus: Calliotropis
- Species: C. crystalophora

Binomial name
- Calliotropis crystalophora Marshall, 1979

Synonyms
- Calliotropis crystalophorus Marshall, 1979 (original combination; incorrect gender ending)

= Calliotropis crystalophora =

Species of gastropod

Calliotropis crystalophora is a species of sea snail, a marine gastropod mollusk in the family Eucyclidae.

== Description ==
The shell can grow to 4.5 mm.

== Distribution ==
It's found in the Southwest Pacific from New Caledonia to Tonga.

Its type locality is southeast of Raoul Island, Kermadec Islands (29°16.5′S 177°14.5′W).

It is classified as "range restricted", which means its range is less than 1,000 km^{2} (390 sq mi).
