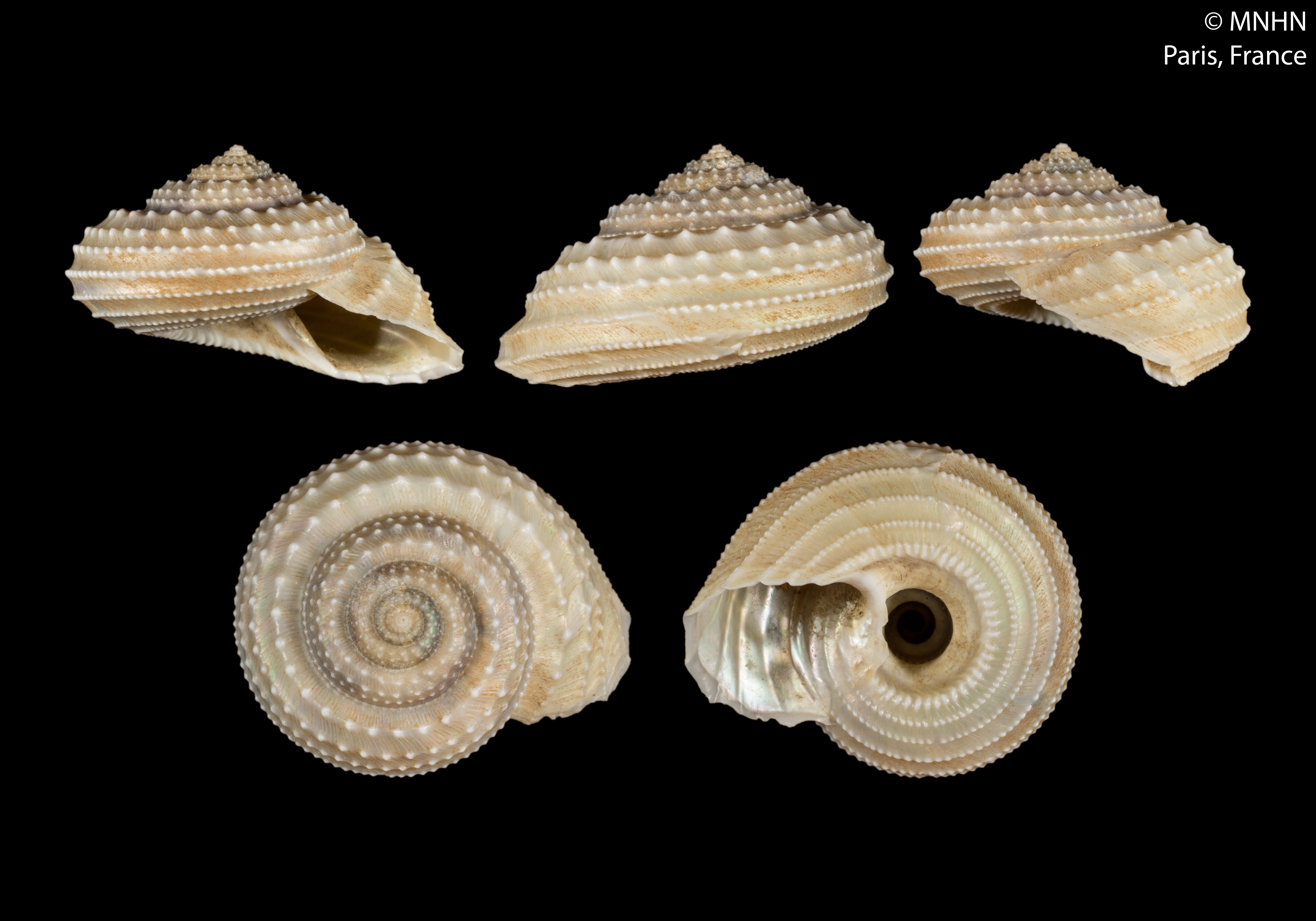
- Shell of Calliotropis pulvinaris (holotype at MNHN, Paris)

Scientific classification
- Kingdom: Animalia
- Phylum: Mollusca
- Class: Gastropoda
- Subclass: Vetigastropoda
- Family: Calliotropidae
- Genus: Calliotropis
- Species: C. pulvinaris

Binomial name
- Calliotropis pulvinaris Vilvens, 2005

= Calliotropis pulvinaris =

Species of gastropod

Calliotropis pulvinaris is a species of sea snail, a marine gastropod mollusk in the family Eucyclidae.

== Morphology ==
See Gastropod shell § Morphology

As Calliotropis pulvinaris is known exclusively from shell specimens, nothing is known about the soft body of the animal.

Collected shell specimens have ranged from 21.8 —29mmm in length and 15.4 — 18.3mm in height. The number of teleoconch whorls ranged from 5.75 to 7. The shell is relatively longer in length and shorter in height that those of other members of the genus.

The shell features numerous nodules where the riblets intersect. The umbilicus is large and deep. The aperture is nearly circular.

== Distribution ==
Calliotropis pulvinaris is known exclusively from locations off the coast of west Madagascar. Specimens have been collected from depths of 580m — 800m.

== Description and etymology ==
Calliotropis pulvinaris was described in 2005 by the Belgian malacologist Claude Vilvens based on eight shell specimens held at the Muséum national d'Histoire naturelle in Paris. The binomial was chosen in reference to the soft, non-angular oval shape of the shell; pulvinaris in Latin means "of a cushion."

== Human impact ==
Some of the known specimens were collected as bycatch by commercial fishing boats trawling for shrimp.
