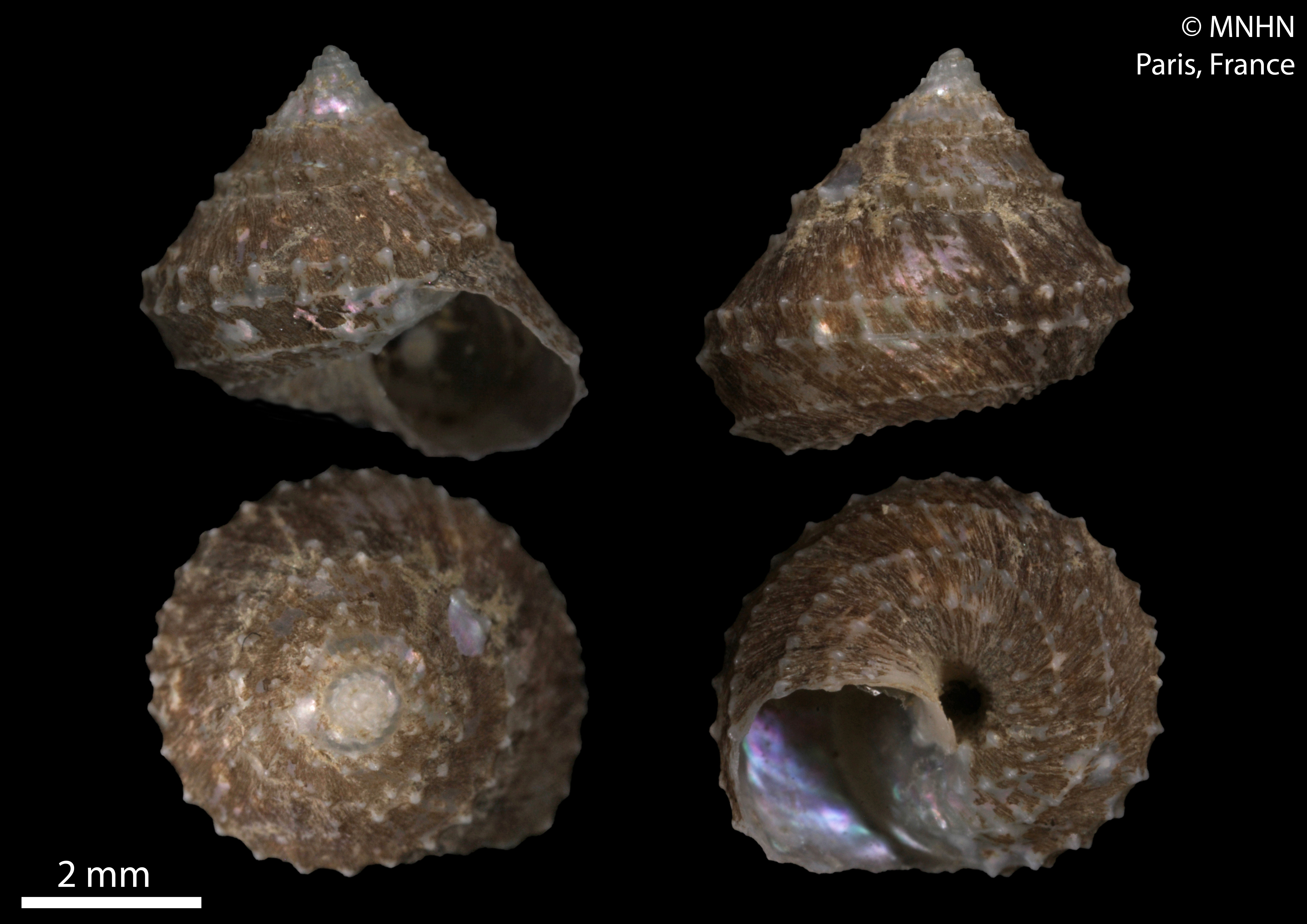
- Shell of Calliotropis stanyi (specimen at MNHN, Paris)

Scientific classification
- Kingdom: Animalia
- Phylum: Mollusca
- Class: Gastropoda
- Subclass: Vetigastropoda
- Family: Calliotropidae
- Genus: Calliotropis
- Species: C. stanyi

Binomial name
- Calliotropis stanyi Poppe, Tagaro & Dekker, 2006

Synonyms
- Calliotropis (Solaricida) stanyi Poppe, Tagaro & Dekker, 2006

= Calliotropis stanyi =

Species of gastropod

Calliotropis stanyi is a species of sea snail, a marine gastropod mollusk in the family Eucyclidae.

== Description ==
The shell size varies between 3.6 mm and 5.4 mm.

== Distribution ==
It occurs in the seas off the Philippines.
