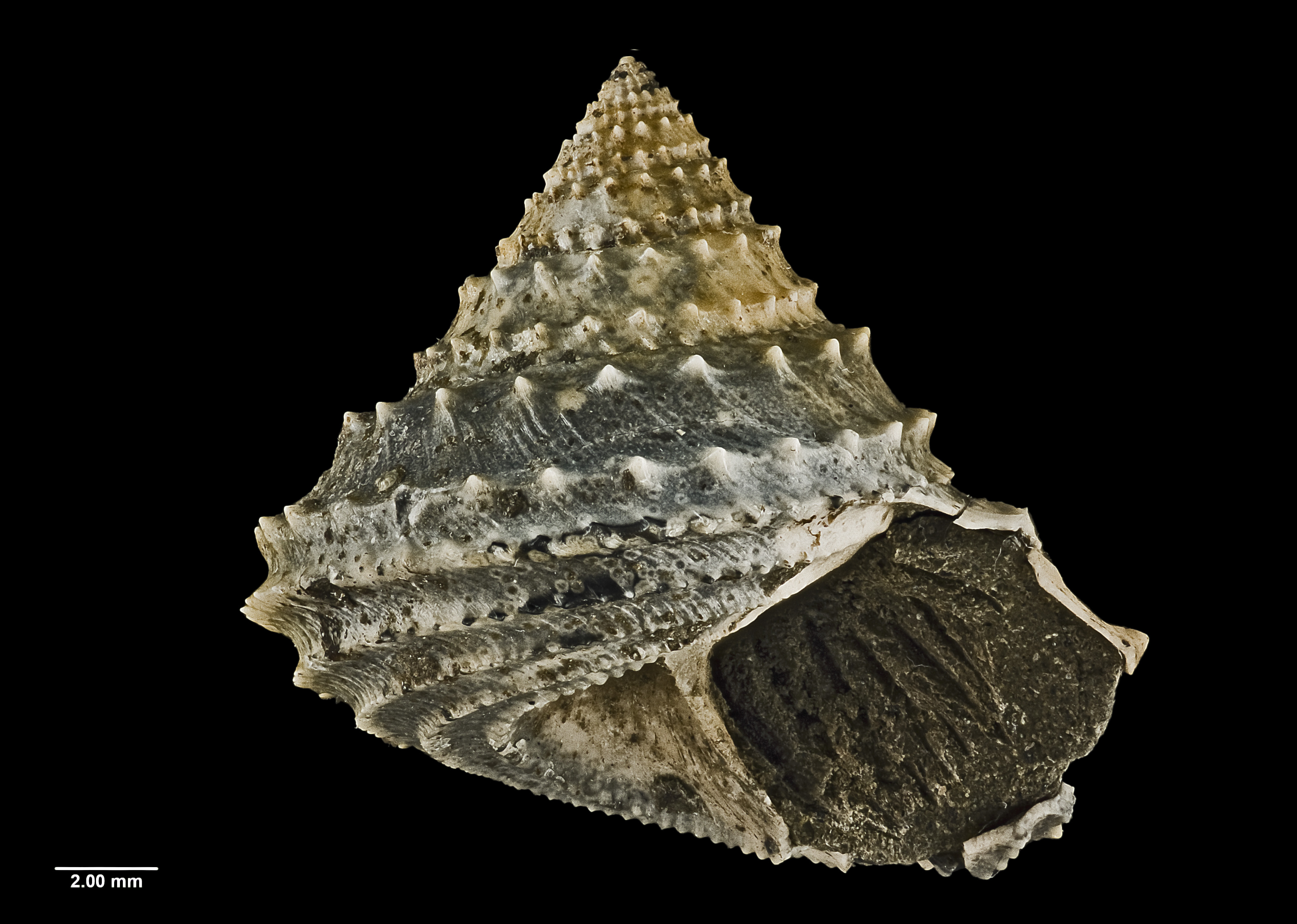
- Holotype from Auckland War Memorial Museum

Scientific classification
- Kingdom: Animalia
- Phylum: Mollusca
- Class: Gastropoda
- Subclass: Vetigastropoda
- Family: Calliotropidae
- Genus: Calliotropis
- Species: †C. motutaraensis

Binomial name
- †Calliotropis motutaraensis A. W. B. Powell, 1935

Synonyms
- Calliotropis (Calliotropis) motutaraensis A. W. B. Powell, 1935

= Calliotropis motutaraensis =

Calliotropis motutaraensis Temporal range: early Miocene

Extinct species of gastropod

Calliotropis motutaraensis is an extinct species of sea snail, a marine gastropod mollusc, in the family Calliotropidae. Fossils of the species date to early Miocene strata of the west coast of the Auckland Region.

== Description ==
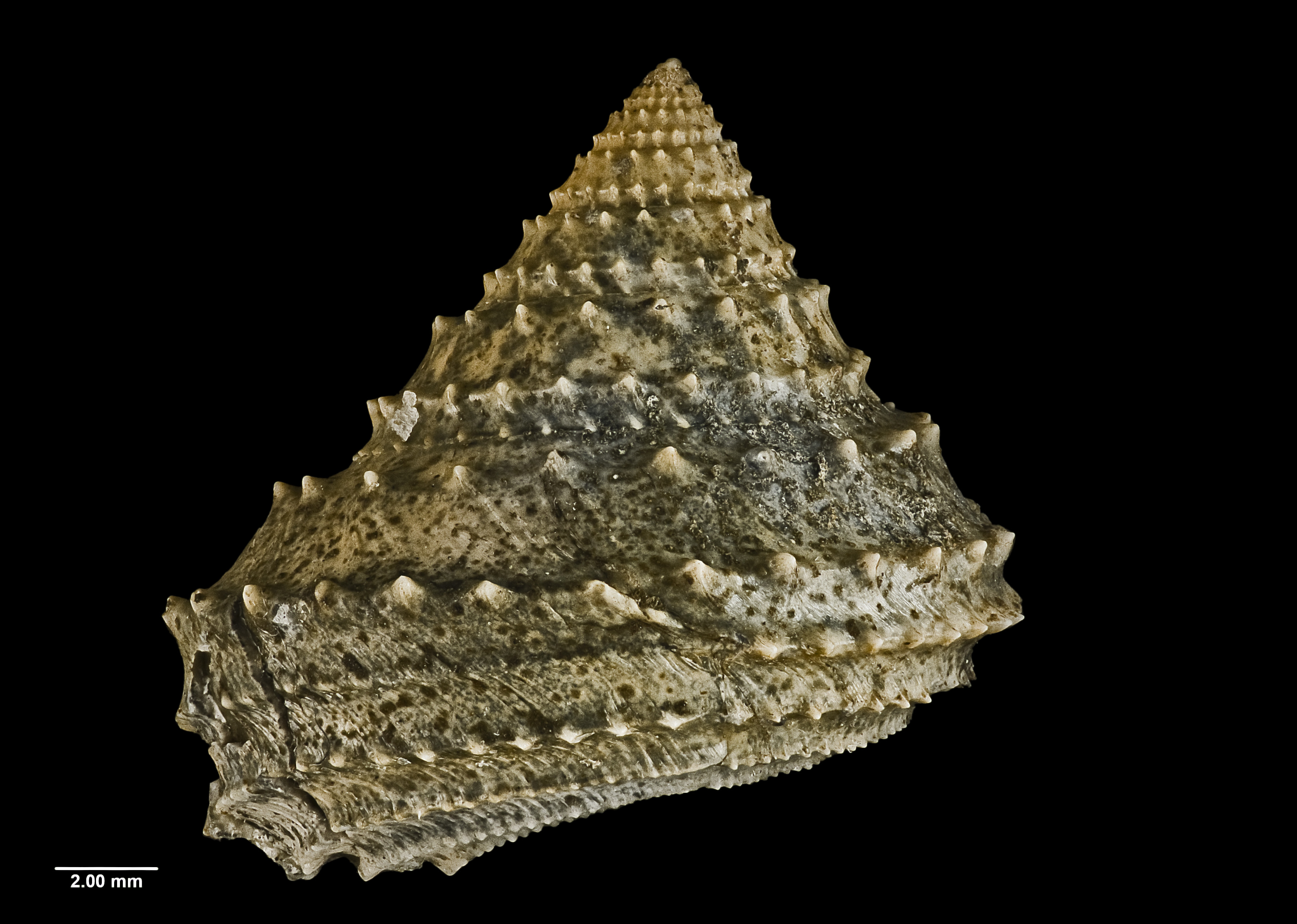
Reverse view of holotype

In the original description, Powell described the species as follows:

Shell fairly large, thin, conical and widely umbilicate. Whorls 8 1/2, including a minute globular smooth protoconch of 1 1/2 whorls. First post-nuclear whorl of closely-spaced crisp axials. Sub-sequent whorls with two widely separated spiral rows of closely-spaced prominent spinose nodules. The distance between the spiral rows is slightly more than double the distance between either one of these spirals and the adjacent suture. There are 19 nodules in one spiral series on the last whorl, and 17 on the third post-nuclear. The body-whorl has a third spinose spiral proceeding from the suture, and four more on the base, the last of which borders a wide and deep funnel-shaped umbilicus, the maximum width of which is about one-third that of the base. The basal spirals have finer and much more numerous nodules. The surface of the upper whorls is smooth, but on the body-whorl there are close but somewhat irregular retractive axial growth lines, those on the base being somewhat stronger and more regular. Aperture rhomboidal. Peristome thin, discontinuous. Inner lip as a thin callosity over the parietal wall. Upper part of columella slightly reflected over the umbilical cavity.

The holotype of the species measures 17 mm (0.67 in) in length and has a diameter of 18 mm (0.71 in).

== Taxonomy ==
The species was first described by A. W. B. Powell in 1935. The holotype was collected at an unknown date prior to 1935 from southern Maukatia Bay near Muriwai, Auckland Region (then more commonly known as Motutara), and is held in the collections of Auckland War Memorial Museum.

== Distribution and habitat ==
This extinct marine species occurs in early Miocene strata of the Nihotupu Formation of New Zealand, on the west coast of the Waitākere Ranges of the Auckland Region, New Zealand. The species likely lived in shallow waters.
