= Tibatrochus husaensis =

Scientific classification
- Kingdom: Animalia
- Phylum: Mollusca
- Class: Gastropoda
- Subclass: Vetigastropoda
- Superfamily: Seguenzioidea
- Family: Eucyclidae
- Genus: Tibatrochus
- Species: T. husaensis

Binomial name
- Tibatrochus husaensis Nomura, 1940

Species of gastropod

Tibatrochus husaensis is a species of sea snail, a marine gastropod mollusk in the family Eucyclidae.

== Description ==
The size of the shell varies between 4 mm and 6.5 mm.

== Distribution ==
This marine species occurs off the Philippines.
