= Putzeysia juttae =

Scientific classification
- Kingdom: Animalia
- Phylum: Mollusca
- Class: Gastropoda
- Subclass: Vetigastropoda
- Superfamily: Seguenzioidea
- Family: Eucyclidae
- Genus: Putzeysia
- Species: P. juttae

Binomial name
- Putzeysia juttae Engl & Rolán, 2009

Species of gastropod

Putzeysia juttae is a species of sea snail, a marine gastropod mollusk in the family Eucyclidae.
