= Putzeysia franziskae =

Scientific classification
- Kingdom: Animalia
- Phylum: Mollusca
- Class: Gastropoda
- Subclass: Vetigastropoda
- Superfamily: Seguenzioidea
- Family: Eucyclidae
- Genus: Putzeysia
- Species: P. franziskae

Binomial name
- Putzeysia franziskae Engl & Rolán, 2009

Species of gastropod

Putzeysia franziskae is a species of sea snail, a marine gastropod mollusk in the family Eucyclidae.

== Description ==
The shell can grow to be 3 mm to 4.2 mm in length.

== Distribution ==
It can be found on the Canary Islands.
