= Cidarina cidaris =

Scientific classification
- Kingdom: Animalia
- Phylum: Mollusca
- Class: Gastropoda
- Subclass: Vetigastropoda
- Family: Calliotropidae
- Genus: Cidarina
- Species: C. cidaris

Binomial name
- Cidarina cidaris (Carpenter, 1864)

Synonyms
- Cidarina cidaris Adams, A., 1864; Lischkeia cidaris (Carpenter, 1864); Margarita cidaris Carpenter, 1864

Species of gastropod

Cidarina cidaris, common name Adam's spiny margarite, is a species of sea snail, a marine gastropod mollusc in the family Calliotropidae.

== Description ==
The height of the gray to grayish white shell attains 20 mm.

(Original description in Latin by Carpenter) "Testa magna, conica, Turcicoidea, tenui; albido-cinerea, nacreo-argentata; anfr. nucleosis —? (decollatis), norm, vii, subplanatis, suturis alte insculptis; superficie spirae tota valide tuberculosa, seriebus tribus, alteris postea intercalantibus; peripheria et basi rotundatis, carinatis; carinis circ. 8, haud acutis, irregularibus, scabris, haud tuberculosis; lacuna umbilicali vix conspicua; apertura subrotundata; labro tenuissimo; labio obsoleto; columella arcuata. "

== Distribution ==
This species occurs in the Pacific Ocean from Alaska to Baja California.
