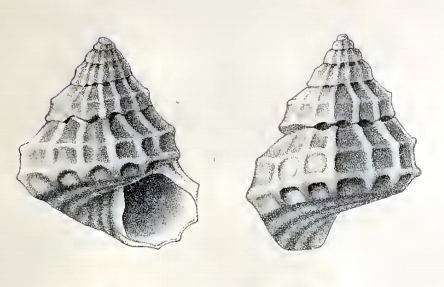
- Original drawing of a shell of Tibatrochus incertus

Scientific classification
- Kingdom: Animalia
- Phylum: Mollusca
- Class: Gastropoda
- Subclass: Vetigastropoda
- Superfamily: Seguenzioidea
- Family: Eucyclidae
- Genus: Tibatrochus
- Species: T. incertus

Binomial name
- Tibatrochus incertus (Schepman, 1908)

Synonyms
- Priotrochus incertus Schepman, 1908

= Tibatrochus incertus =

Species of gastropod

Tibatrochus incertus is a species of sea snail, a marine gastropod mollusk in the family Eucyclidae.

== Description ==
(Original description by M.M. Schepman) The size of the shell varies between 2.5 mm and 6.1 mm. The imperforate, yellowish-white shell has a conical shape with a convex base, . The six convex whorls are separated by a deep suture, which is waved by the ends of the ribs. The nucleus is smooth, the other whorls have strong ribs, of which there are 12 on the body whorl. They are crossed on the lower whorls by 2 spiral cords, producing tubercles on the ribs. These ribs extend on the base till the first infraperipheral cord. The base of the shell is convex, with 5 spiral lirae. The whole shell is covered with microscopic, oblong punctures. The aperture is nearly circular. The thin outer and basal margin are regularly curved, and slightly thickened interiorly. The columella is nearly straight, with an inconspicuous tubercle about halfway, near the base with a rounded angle. The inside of the aperture is nacreous.

== Distribution ==
This marine species occurs off Indonesia and the Philippines.
