= Putzeysia cillisi =

Scientific classification
- Kingdom: Animalia
- Phylum: Mollusca
- Class: Gastropoda
- Subclass: Vetigastropoda
- Family: Eucyclidae
- Genus: Putzeysia
- Species: P. cillisi

Binomial name
- Putzeysia cillisi Segers, Swinnen & De Prins, 2009

Species of gastropod

Putzeysia cillisi is a species of sea snail, a marine gastropod mollusk in the family Eucyclidae.

== Description ==
The height of the shell attains 2.5 mm.

== Distribution ==
This species occurs in the Atlantic Ocean off Madeira.
