= Echinogurges anoxius =

Scientific classification
- Kingdom: Animalia
- Phylum: Mollusca
- Class: Gastropoda
- Subclass: Vetigastropoda
- Family: Calliotropidae
- Genus: Echinogurges
- Species: E. anoxius

Binomial name
- Echinogurges anoxius (Dall, 1927)

Synonyms
- Solariella anoxia Dall, 1927 (original combination)

Species of gastropod

Echinogurges anoxius is a species of sea snail, a marine gastropod mollusc in the family Calliotropidae.

== Description ==
The height of the shell attains 3.8 mm.

== Distribution ==
This species occurs in the Atlantic Ocean off Georgia and Eastern Florida at depths between 535 m and 805 m.
