= Echinogurges tuberculatus =

Scientific classification
- Kingdom: Animalia
- Phylum: Mollusca
- Class: Gastropoda
- Subclass: Vetigastropoda
- Family: Calliotropidae
- Genus: Echinogurges
- Species: E. tuberculatus

Binomial name
- Echinogurges tuberculatus Quinn, 1991

Synonyms
- Echinogurges rhysus auct. non Watson, 1879

Species of gastropod

Echinogurges tuberculatus is a species of sea snail, a marine gastropod mollusk in the family Calliotropidae.

== Description ==
Described by J.F. Quinn Jr. in 1991, this marine gastropod is characterised by a shell that reaches a height of approximately 4.6 mm.

== Distribution ==
This species occurs in the Caribbean Sea off Cuba and Yucatan; in the Atlantic Ocean off Georgia, the Bahamas and the Florida Strait.
