= Echinogurges clavatus =

Scientific classification
- Kingdom: Animalia
- Phylum: Mollusca
- Class: Gastropoda
- Subclass: Vetigastropoda
- Family: Calliotropidae
- Genus: Echinogurges
- Species: E. clavatus

Binomial name
- Echinogurges clavatus (Watson, 1879)

Synonyms
- Margarita clavatus (Watson, 1879); Solariella clavatus (Watson, 1879); Trochus (Margarita) clavatus Watson, 1879 (original combination)

Species of gastropod

Echinogurges clavatus is a species of sea snail, a marine gastropod mollusc in the family Calliotropidae.

== Description ==
(Original description by Watson) The height of the shell attains 4.2 mm. The small shell has a conical shape with a high spire and a tumid base, a round aperture, and a deep umbilicus. It is covered with sharp prickles.

Sculpture. Spirals: There are several small threads, two of which, of equal strength and prominence, angulate the whorls—one at the basal contraction, the other about halfway up the whorl; On the base they are somewhat closer set. The outer lip does not meet the carinal thread, but the one below.

Longitudinals: The whole surface is crossed by close-set, slightly oblique narrow laminae, which, in crossing the spirals, rise into sharp vaulted prickles whose faces are turned towards the mouth.

Colour : white, with a pearly lustre.

The spire is very high. The apex is minute, with the small embryonic 1¼ whorl rising from a minute flat. The shell contains 6¼ whorls, angulated and narrow in the spire, but the body whorl is inflated and expanded. The suture is deeply impressed, somewhat depressed, and very strongly defined. The perpendicular aperture is round, slightly pointed on the base, and angulated at the upper carina. The outer lip is sharp, advancing far across the body towards the columellar lip. The columellar lip is depressed upon the umbilicus, then rounded and sinuated, slightly toothed at the point of the pillar. The umbilicus is wide and deep, but internally narrowed.

The peculiarly high narrow spire and the vaulted prickles are very characteristic features of this species. When full-grown, there would probably be an additional whorl, which would add a broad base to the high narrow spire. There seems to be some variation in the number of the spirals.

== Distribution ==
This species occurs in the Gulf of Mexico, the Caribbean Sea; in the Atlantic Ocean off the Bahamas and Brazil at depths between 713 m and 1609 m.
