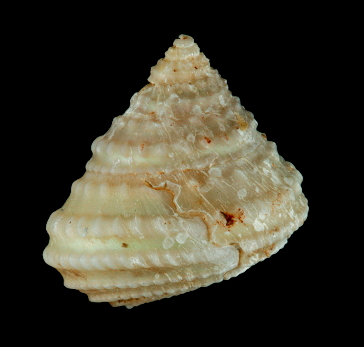
- Shell of Calliotropis granolirata

Scientific classification
- Kingdom: Animalia
- Phylum: Mollusca
- Class: Gastropoda
- Subclass: Vetigastropoda
- Family: Calliotropidae
- Genus: Calliotropis
- Species: C. granolirata

Binomial name
- Calliotropis granolirata (Sowerby III, 1903)

Synonyms
- Calliostoma (Lischkeia) granoliratum G. B. Sowerby III, 1903 (basionym); Calliostoma granoliratum G. B. Sowerby III, 1903 (original combination)

= Calliotropis granolirata =

Species of gastropod

Calliotropis granolirata, common name the Cape cog shell, is a species of sea snail, a marine gastropod mollusk in the family Calliotropidae.

== Description ==
The length of the shell reaches 25 mm.

The shell is small, featuring a conical spire and a rounded base. It is sculpted with prominent spiral cords that bear well-developed granules. The spire whorls have three cords, including one at the periphery, while the base is adorned with four cords. The umbilicus is closed, and the aperture displays a nacreous (mother-of-pearl) sheen when the shell is fresh.

Coloration is uniformly milky-white to pale buff, with a matte, non-lustrous finish.

== Distribution ==
A marine species endemic to South Africa, it has been reliably recorded only from deep waters off the Cape Agulhas–Cape Point region, at depths reaching up to 2,750 meters.
