= Echinogurges tubulatus =

Scientific classification
- Kingdom: Animalia
- Phylum: Mollusca
- Class: Gastropoda
- Subclass: Vetigastropoda
- Family: Calliotropidae
- Genus: Echinogurges
- Species: E. tubulatus

Binomial name
- Echinogurges tubulatus (Dall, 1927)

Synonyms
- Solariella tubulata Dall, 1927 (original combination)

Species of gastropod

Echinogurges tubulatus is a species of sea snail, a marine gastropod mollusc in the family Calliotropidae.

== Description ==
The shell grows to a height of 3.7 mm.

== Distribution ==
This species occurs in the Atlantic Ocean off Georgia and Florida at depths between 538 m and 805 m.
