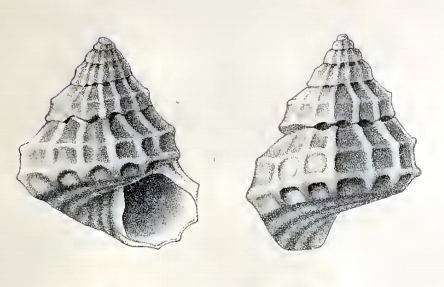
- Tibatrochus incertus

Scientific classification
- Kingdom: Animalia
- Phylum: Mollusca
- Class: Gastropoda
- Subclass: Vetigastropoda
- Superfamily: Seguenzioidea
- Family: Eucyclidae
- Genus: Tibatrochus; Nomura, 1940

Type species
- Tibatrochus husaensis Nomura, 1940

= Tibatrochus =

Genus of molluscs

Tibatrochus is a genus of mostly small deep water sea snails, marine gastropod mollusks in the family Eucyclidae.

== Species ==
Species within the genus Tibatrochus include:

- Tibatrochus husaensis Nomura, 1940
- Tibatrochus incertus (Schepman, 1908)
