= Echinogurges =

Scientific classification
- Kingdom: Animalia
- Phylum: Mollusca
- Class: Gastropoda
- Subclass: Vetigastropoda
- Family: Calliotropidae
- Genus: Echinogurges; Quinn, 1979

Genus of gastropods

Echinogurges is a genus of sea snails, marine gastropod molluscs in the family Calliotropidae.

== Species ==
Species within the genus Echinogurges include:

- Echinogurges anoxius (Dall, 1927)
- Echinogurges clavatus (Watson, 1879)
- Echinogurges tuberculatus Quinn, 1991
- Echinogurges tubulatus (Dall, 1927)
