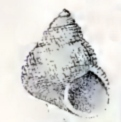
- Putzeysia wiseri

Scientific classification
- Kingdom: Animalia
- Phylum: Mollusca
- Class: Gastropoda
- Subclass: Vetigastropoda
- Family: Eucyclidae
- Genus: Putzeysia; Sulliotti, 1889

= Putzeysia =

Genus of gastropods

Putzeysia is a genus of sea snails, marine gastropod molluscs in the family Eucyclidae,

== Species ==
Species within the genus Putzeysia include:

- Putzeysia cillisi Segers, Swinnen & De Prins, 2009
- Putzeysia franziskae Engl & Rolán, 2009
- Putzeysia juttae Engl & Rolán, 2009
- Putzeysia rickyi Reitano & Scuderi, 2021
- Putzeysia wiseri (Calcara, 1842)
