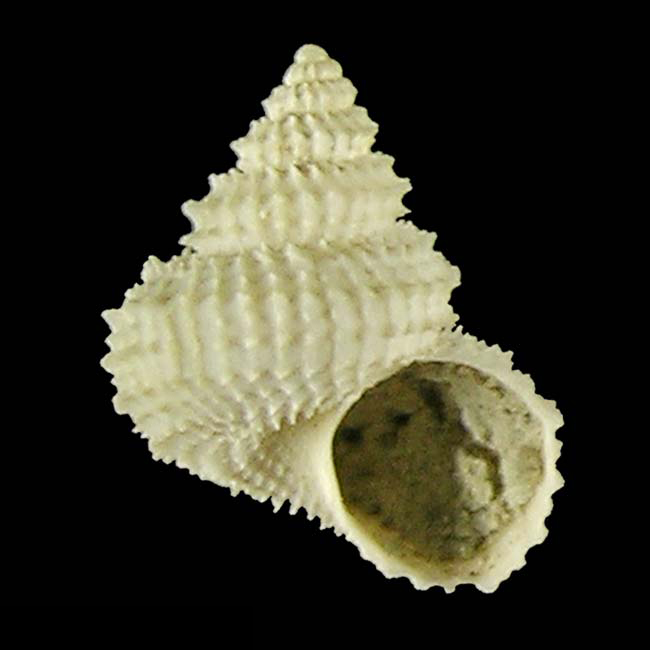
- Spinicalliotropis spinosa

Scientific classification
- Kingdom: Animalia
- Phylum: Mollusca
- Class: Gastropoda
- Subclass: Vetigastropoda
- Family: Calliotropidae
- Genus: Spinicalliotropis; Poppe, Tagaro & Dekker, 2006

Type species
- Spinicalliotropis spinosa (Poppe, Tagaro & Dekker, 2006)

Species
- See text

Synonyms
- Calliotropis (Spinicalliotropis) Poppe, Tagaro & Dekker, 2006 (original combination)

= Spinicalliotropis =

Genus of gastropods

Spinicalliotropis is a genus of sea snail, a marine gastropod mollusc in the family Calliotropidae.

== Species ==
- Spinicalliotropis chalkeie (Vilvens, 2007)
- Spinicalliotropis ericius (Vilvens, 2006)
- Spinicalliotropis lamellifera (Jansen, 1994)
- Spinicalliotropis solariellaformis Vilvens, 2006
- Spinicalliotropis spinosa (Poppe, Tagaro & Dekker, 2006)
- Spinicalliotropis stephanos Vilvens, 2021
