= Cidarina =

Scientific classification
- Kingdom: Animalia
- Phylum: Mollusca
- Class: Gastropoda
- Subclass: Vetigastropoda
- Family: Calliotropidae
- Genus: Cidarina; Dall, 1909

Genus of gastropods

Cidarina is a genus of sea snails, marine gastropod molluscs in the family Calliotropidae.

== Species ==
Species within the genus Cidarina include:

- Cidarina cidaris (Carpenter, 1864)
