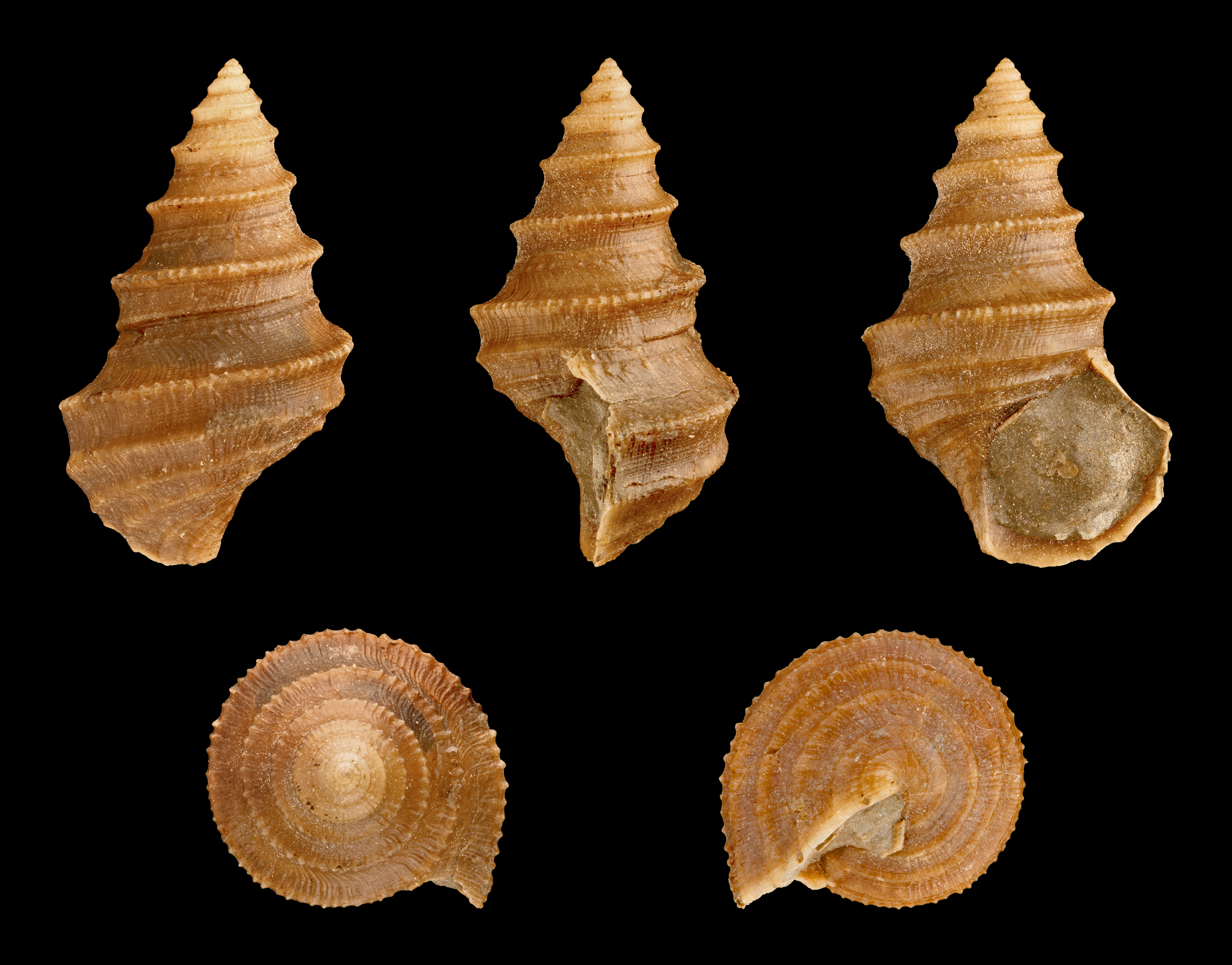
- Eucyclus capitaneus Cossmann 1916

Scientific classification
- Kingdom: Animalia
- Phylum: Mollusca
- Class: Gastropoda
- Subclass: Vetigastropoda
- Superfamily: Seguenzioidea
- Family: Eucyclidae; Koken, 1868

Genera
- See text

Synonyms
- List: Amberleyidae Wenz 1938; †Amberleyoidea Wenz, 1938

= Eucyclidae =

Family of gastropods

Eucyclidae is a family of gastropods in the superfamily Seguenzioidea (according to the taxonomy of the Gastropoda by Bouchet & Rocroi, 2005).

This family has no subfamilies.

== Genera ==
Genera within the family Eucyclidae include:

- Amberleya J. Morris & Lycett, 1851 †
- Bathybembix Crosse, 1893
- Calliomphalus Cossmann, 1888 †
- Calliotropis Seguenza, 1903
- Cidarina Dall, 1909
- Echinogurges Quinn, 1979
- Eucycloidea Hudleston, 1888 †
- Ginebis Is. Taki & Otuka, 1943
- Lischkeia Fischer, 1879
- Putzeysia Sulliotti, 1889
- Riselloidea Cossmann, 1909 †
- Spinicalliotropis Poppe, Tagaro & Dekker, 2006
- Tibatrochus Nomura, 1940
- Toroidia Hoffman & Freiwald, 2018
- Turcica Adams & Adams, 1854

Genera brought into synonymy

- Bembix R. B. Watson, 1879 : synonym of Bathybembix Crosse, 1893 (Invalid: Junior homonym of Bembix Fabricius, 1775 [Hymenoptera])
- Convexia Noda, 1975 : synonym of Ginebis Is. Taki & Otuka, 1943
- Mazastele Iredale, 1936 : synonym of Calliotropis Seguenza, 1903
- Ptychostylis Gabb, 1865 : synonym of Turcica Adams & Adams, 1854
- Solaricida Dall, 1919 : synonym of Calliotropis L. Seguenza, 1903 (synonym)
- Solariellopsis Schepman, 1908 : synonym of Calliotropis (Schepmanotropis) Poppe, Tagaro & Dekker, 2006 represented as Calliotropis L. Seguenza, 1903 (Invalid: junior homonym of Solariellopsis de Gregorio, 1886; Schepmanotropis is a replacement name)
- Turcicula Dall, 1881 : synonym of Lischkeia P. Fischer, 1879
