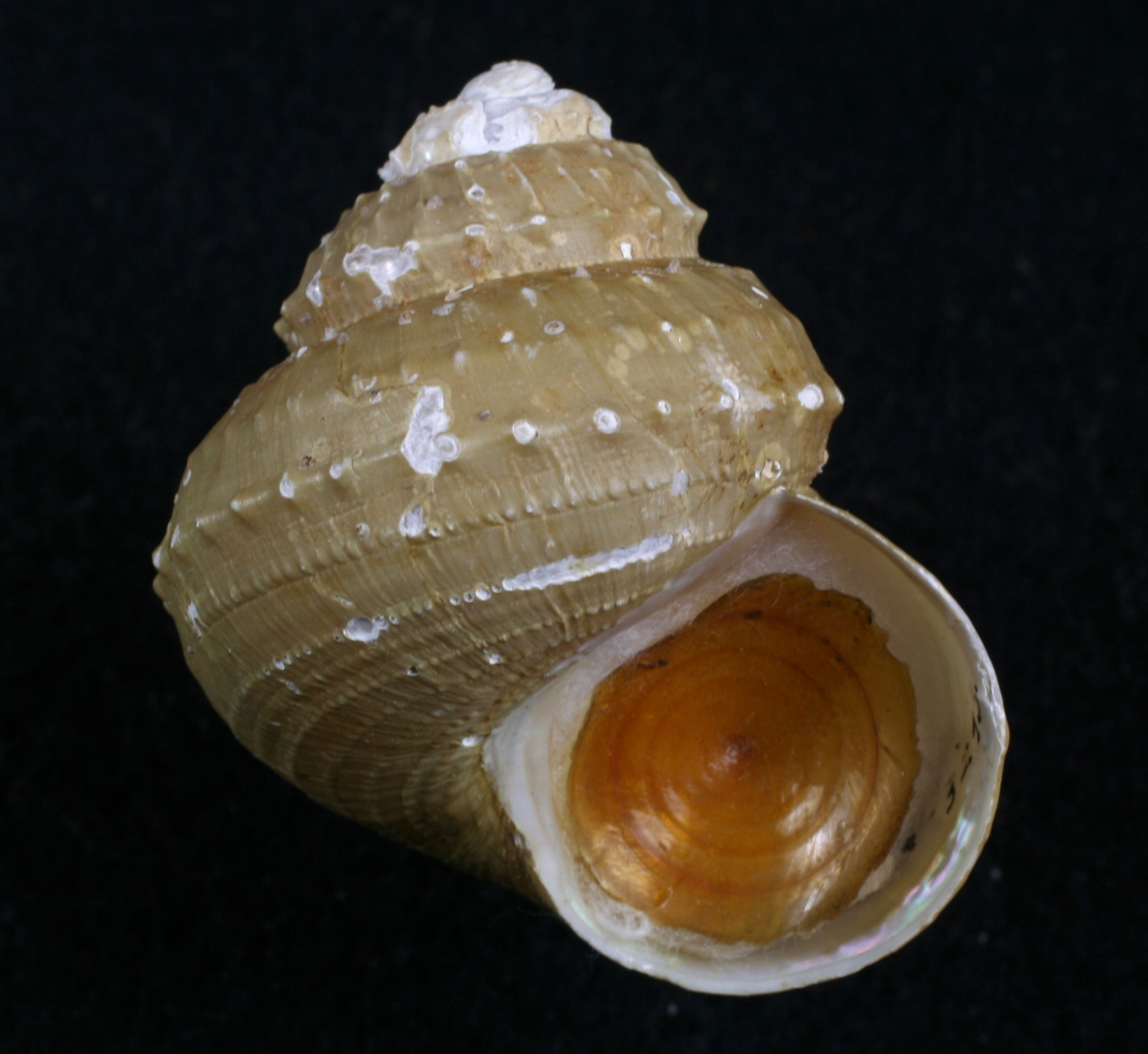
- Apertural view of shell of Bathybembix bairdii (Dall, 1889) with operculum.

Scientific classification
- Kingdom: Animalia
- Phylum: Mollusca
- Class: Gastropoda
- Subclass: Vetigastropoda
- Superfamily: Seguenzioidea
- Family: Calliotropidae; Hickman & McLean, 1990

Genera
- See text

= Calliotropidae =

Family of molluscs

Calliotropidae is a family of sea snails, marine gastropod mollusks in the superfamily Seguenzioidea.

== Taxonomy ==
=== 2005 taxonomy ===
Calliotropidae was classified as the subfamily Calliotropinae within Chilodontidae according to the taxonomy of the Gastropoda by Bouchet & Rocroi, 2005.

=== 2007-2009 taxonomy ===
Molecular phylogeny research on Seguenzioidea was published by Kano (2007).

Kano et al. (2009) elevated the subfamily Calliotropinae to family level as Calliotropidae.

== Genera ==
Genera within the family Calliotropidae include:

- Bathybembix Crosse, 1893
- Calliotropis L. Seguenza, 1903
- Cidarina Dall, 1909
- Convexia Noda, 1975
- Echinogurges Quinn, 1979
- Ginebis Taki & Otuka, 1942
- Lischkeia P. Fischer, 1879
- Putzeysia Sulliotti, 1889
- Spinicalliotropis Poppe, Tagaro & Dekker, 2006

Genera brought into synonymy

- Bembix Watson, 1879: synonym of Bathybembix Crosse, 1893
- Solaricida Dall, 1919: synonym of Calliotropis L. Seguenza, 1903
- Turcicula Dall, 1881: synonym of Lischkeia P. Fischer, 1879
