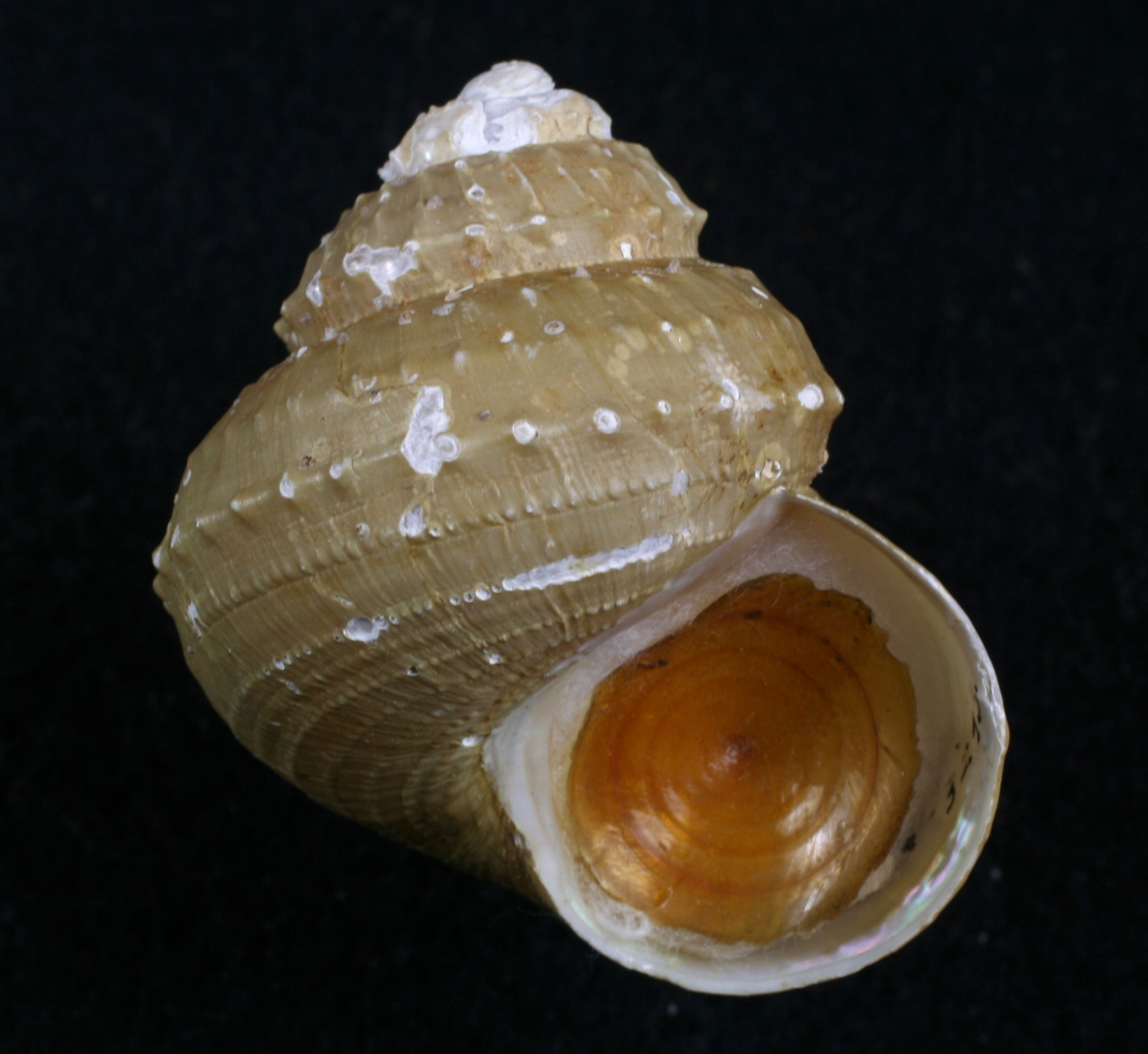
- Apertural view of shell of Bathybembix bairdii (Dall, 1889) with operculum

Scientific classification
- Kingdom: Animalia
- Phylum: Mollusca
- Class: Gastropoda
- Subclass: Vetigastropoda
- Family: Calliotropidae
- Genus: Bathybembix; Crosse, 1893

Synonyms
- Bembix Watson, 1879 (Invalid)

= Bathybembix =

Genus of gastropods

Bathybembix is a genus of deep-water sea snails, marine gastropod molluscs in the family Calliotropidae.

This genus was originally called Bembix by Robert B. Watson (, but as this was a junior homonym of Bembix Fabricius, 1775 [Hymenoptera], it was declared invalid. It was renamed in 1893 by Crosse as Bathybembix

== Description ==
The shell has a conical shape with a high spire. It is carinated and umbilicated. The base of the shell is inflated. The shell is covered with a thin, extremely persistent, smooth, fibrous epidermis, The epidermis swells up and becomes pustulated in water. The axis of the shell is perforated, and the columella is thin, reverted, and merely angulated in front.

== Species ==
Species within the genus Bathybembix include:

- Bathybembix abyssorum (Smith, 1891)
- Bathybembix aeola (Watson, 1879)
- Bathybembix bairdii (Dall, 1889)
- Bathybembix delicatula Dall, 1990
- Bathybembix drakei Dall, 1990
- Bathybembix galapagana (Dall, 1908)
- Bathybembix humboldti Rehder, 1971
- Bathybembix macdonaldi (Dall, 1890)

Species brought into synonymy

- Bathybembix ceratophora (Dall, 1896) accepted as Calliotropis ceratophora (Dall, 1896)
- Bathybembix equatorialis (Dall, 1896) accepted as Calliotropis equatorialis (Dall, 1896)
