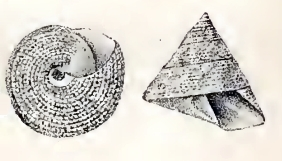
- Drawing with two views of a shell of Calliostoma tampaense

Scientific classification
- Kingdom: Animalia
- Phylum: Mollusca
- Class: Gastropoda
- Subclass: Vetigastropoda
- Order: Trochida
- Family: Calliostomatidae
- Genus: Calliostoma
- Species: C. tampaense

Binomial name
- Calliostoma tampaense (Conrad, 1846)

Synonyms
- Calliostoma jujubinum var. perspectivum Koch in Philippi, 1843; Eutrochus alternatus Sowerby, 1873; Trochus perspectivus Koch in Philippi, 1843; Trochus tampaensis Conrad, 1846 (original combination)

= Calliostoma tampaense =

Species of gastropod

Calliostoma tampaense is a species of sea snail, a marine gastropod mollusk in the family Calliostomatidae.

== Description ==
The shell grows to a height of 24 mm. The shell has a straight conical form, broader than Calliostoma jujubinum (Gmelin, 1791). The whorls are flat above, not prominent at the sutures or concave. The spiral riblets or stria are fewer, and all beaded. The color of the shell is light brown, clouded with darker, often marked with white on the periphery. The umbilicus has a larger perforation, and is bounded by a distinctly beaded rib.

== Distribution ==
This species occurs in the Gulf of Mexico off Florida at a depth between 0 m and 11 m.
