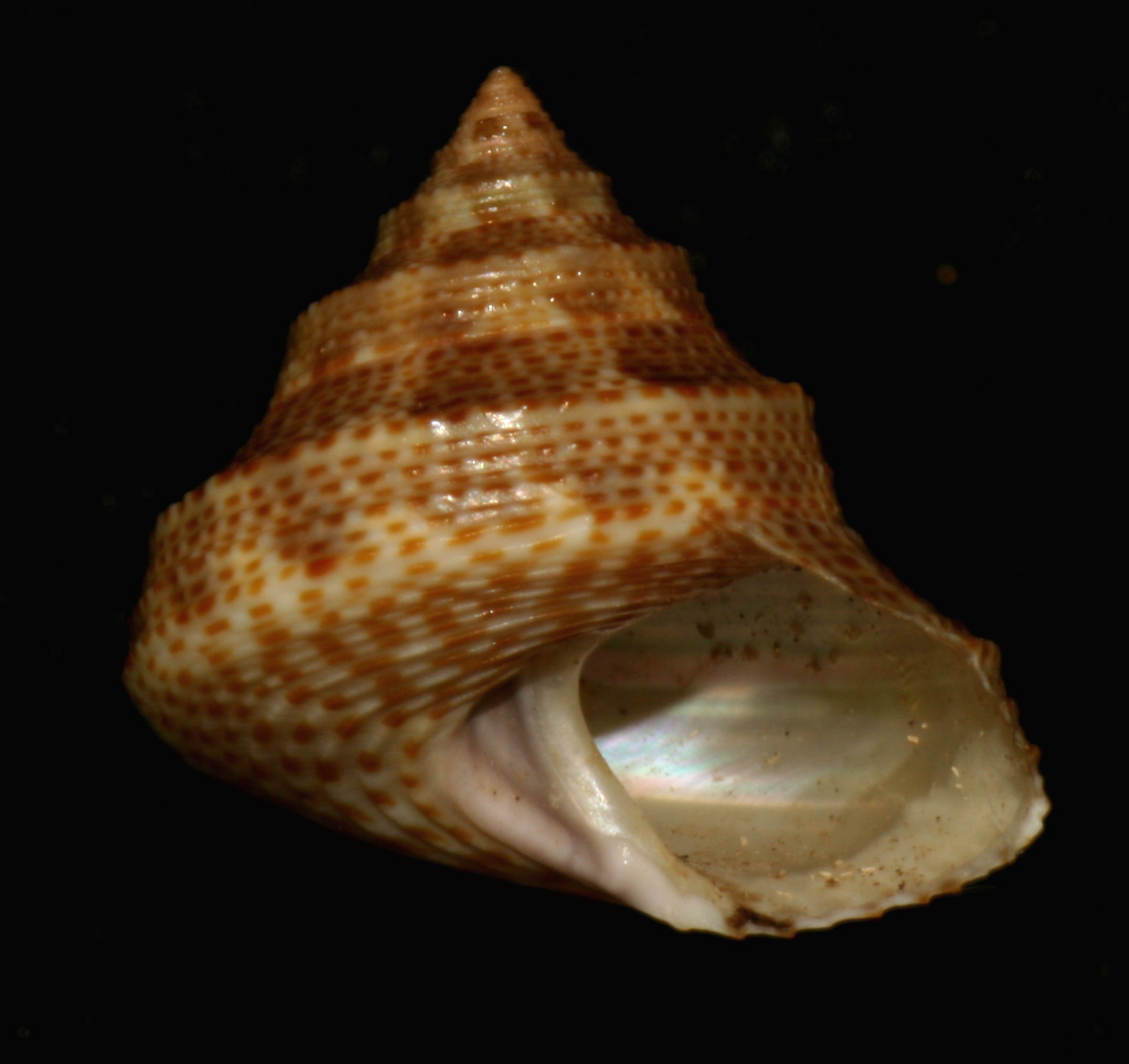
- Apertural view of a shell of Calliostoma palmeri Dall, 1871, 25.7 mm height by 27.6 mm diameter, from Puerto Penasco, Mexico

Scientific classification
- Kingdom: Animalia
- Phylum: Mollusca
- Class: Gastropoda
- Subclass: Vetigastropoda
- Order: Trochida
- Family: Calliostomatidae
- Genus: Calliostoma
- Species: C. palmeri

Binomial name
- Calliostoma palmeri Dall, 1871

= Calliostoma palmeri =

Species of gastropod

Calliostoma palmeri, common name Palmer's top shell, is a species of sea snail, a marine gastropod mollusk in the family Calliostomatidae.

== Description ==
The shell consists of seven whorls, glistening and polished, though sculptured with finely granulated, revolving lines. The upper whorls are carinate and shouldered. The body whorl is bicarinate. The sculpture consists above of about fifteen revolving, elevated, finely granulated lines, alternately spotted with light yellow, brown and white The basal surface has about eleven similarly colored ribs, which are not granulated, but have the interspaces slightly decussated by the lines of growth. The upper surface is also painted with narrow waved white and broad livid patches, which are absent below. The umbilical region is cobalt blue, or blue-purple, rather excavated, and bordered by a carina. The bright and pearly aperture is subquadrate. The white columella is arcuate. The tooth-like process has a blue color. The nucleus consists of two and a half whorls, flesh color, with revolving lines.

The shell of this species is very similar to that of Calliostoma bonita, but there are a few recognizable differences. The shell reaches a larger size and appears more squat than in C. bonita, because it has a lower spire. The shell appears to be thin and is relatively lightweight for its size. Sculpturally the carinations along the base and periphery are not as strong as in C. bonita and the peripheral carination is located higher on the whorl giving the shell a very distinct profile. The darker brown color markings on the tan shell are not as bold or distinct as in C. bonita. Its height varies between 20 mm and 30 mm. Average size: Height 24 mm, diameter 28 mm.

Despite the range overlap there is no known intergradation between Calliostoma palmeri and C. bonita and the two species are considered to be distinct but closely related, making them sibling species. It is also close to Calliostoma eximium from which it is readily distinguished by the blue umbilical region and the different coloration of the revolving ribs.

== Distribution ==
This is a Panamic Province species which is generally found from the northern end of the Gulf of California to Guaymas, Mexico, and is found in the low intertidal zone to the subtidal zone to depths of 45 m.
