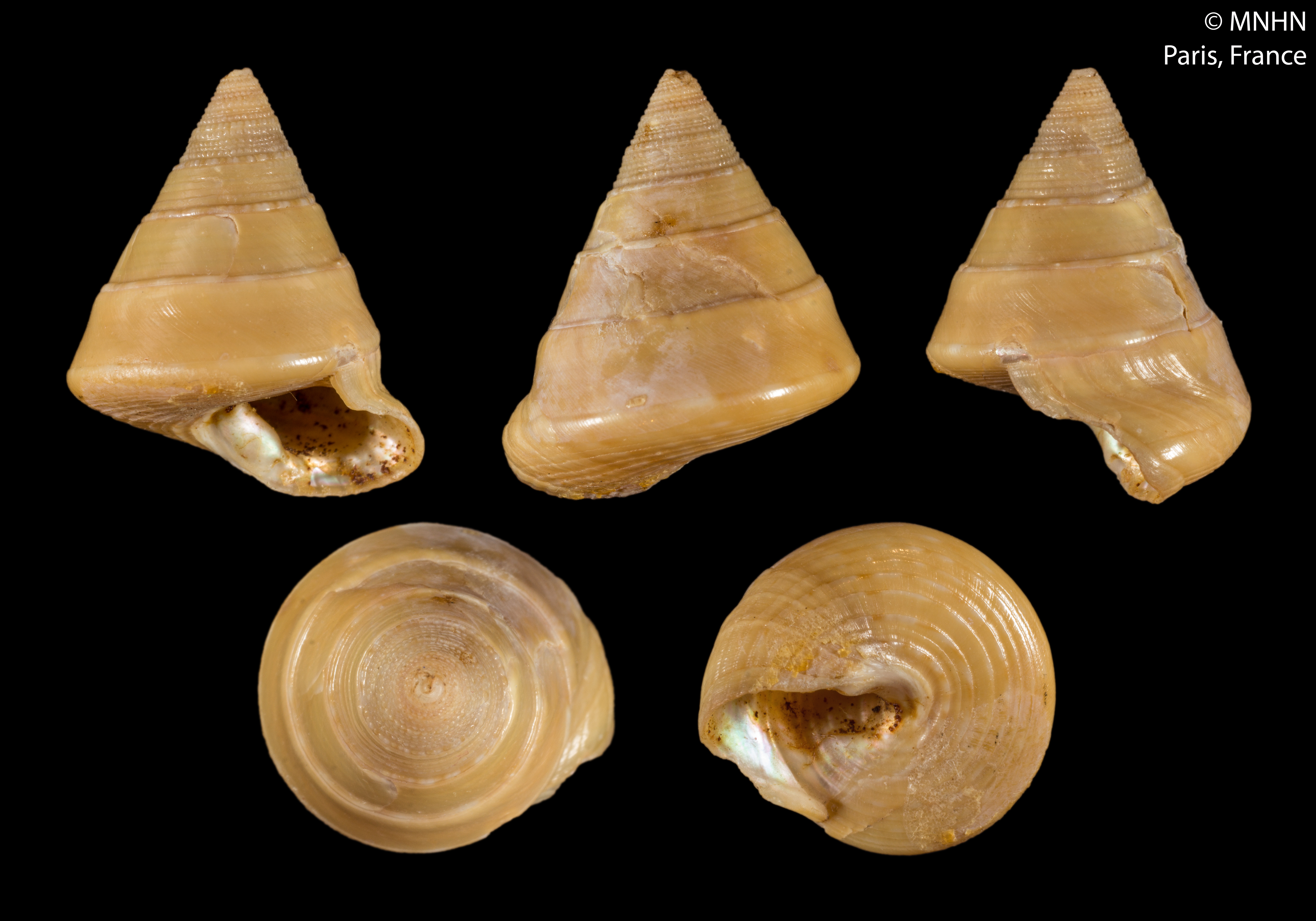
- Shell of Calliostoma conulus (lectotype at MNHN, Paris)

Scientific classification
- Kingdom: Animalia
- Phylum: Mollusca
- Class: Gastropoda
- Subclass: Vetigastropoda
- Order: Trochida
- Family: Calliostomatidae
- Genus: Calliostoma
- Species: C. conulus

Binomial name
- Calliostoma conulus (Linnaeus, 1758)

Synonyms
- Calliostoma dubium (Philippi, 1844) (preoccupied species name); Calliostoma (Calliostoma) conulum (Linnaeus, C., 1758); Trochus conulus Linnaeus, 1758 (original description); Zizyphinus lucidus Risso

= Calliostoma conulus =

Species of gastropod

Calliostoma conulus is a species of sea snail, a marine gastropod mollusk in the family Calliostomatidae. This is the type species of the genus.

The variety Calliostoma conulus var. livida Dautzenberg, 1927 is a synonym of Calliostoma lividum Dautzenberg, 1927

== Description ==
The shell has an elevated-conical shape. The height of the shell varies between 10 mm and 35 mm. The shell is carinated at the periphery. It has a yellow or delicate flesh color, with obscure clouds or macula. It is alternately whitish and brown below the suture and painted on the peripheral rib in the same alternate manner. The surface of the shell is highly polished. The apical whorl is smooth, the next four or five whorls are densely granulate (granules in 4 or 5 series). The next whorl is generally spirally ribbed.

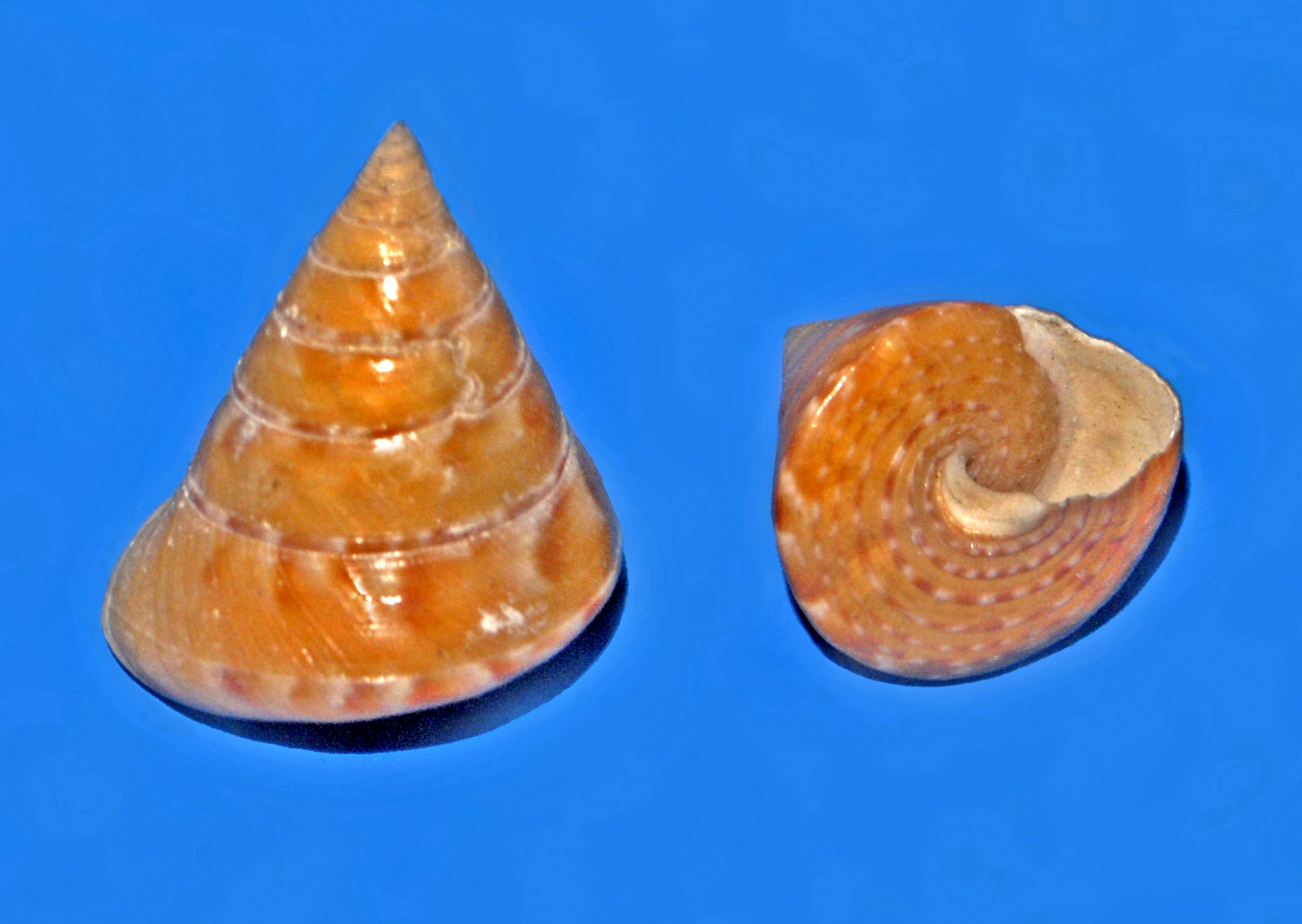
Shells of Calliostoma conulus

The following whorls are smooth, or with very obscure traces of spiral lines. The base of the shell is flat, smooth, save for 3 to 6 concentric articulated riblets around the axis. The outlines of the spire are straight. There are about 10 flat whorls, separated by a linear suture with a distinct narrow supra-sutural fasciole. The rhomboidal aperture is smooth within. The pearly columella is shorter and more knobbed at its base than in Calliostoma zizyphinum.

== Distribution ==
This marine species occurs in European waters, off Spain and Portugal and in the Mediterranean Sea off Greece and Sicily; in the Atlantic Ocean off the Canary Islands, Madeira and the Azores.
