= Calliostoma psyche =

Scientific classification
- Kingdom: Animalia
- Phylum: Mollusca
- Class: Gastropoda
- Subclass: Vetigastropoda
- Order: Trochida
- Family: Calliostomatidae
- Genus: Calliostoma
- Species: C. psyche

Binomial name
- Calliostoma psyche Dall, 1888

Synonyms
- Calliostoma (Kombologian) bairdii psyche (Dall, W.H., 1889)

Species of gastropod

Calliostoma psyche, the Psyche top shell, is a species of sea snail, a marine gastropod mollusk in the family Calliostomatidae.

== Description ==
The size of the shell varies between 15 mm and 24 mm. This is the southern variety of Calliostoma bairdii of which W.H. Dall considered it to be a variety. It is paler and more delicately colored. It is less elevated and its lateral outlines are slightly concave.

== Distribution ==
This species occurs in the Gulf of Mexico and in the Atlantic Ocean from North Carolina to Key West, USA, at depths between 26 m and 443 m.
