= Baird's top shell =

Baird's top shell may refer to:

- Bathybembix bairdii, of the family Calliotropida
- Calliostoma bairdii, a calliostoma top snail
