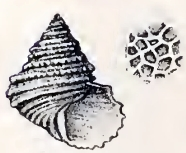
- Drawing of a shell of Calliostoma stirophorum

Scientific classification
- Kingdom: Animalia
- Phylum: Mollusca
- Class: Gastropoda
- Subclass: Vetigastropoda
- Order: Trochida
- Family: Calliostomatidae
- Subfamily: Calliostomatinae
- Genus: Calliostoma
- Species: C. stirophorum

Binomial name
- Calliostoma stirophorum (Watson, 1879)

Synonyms
- Calliostoma arestum Dall, W.H., 1927; Otukaia stirophorum (Watson, 1879); Trochus (Ziziphinus) stirophorus Watson, 1879 (original combination)

= Calliostoma stirophorum =

Species of gastropod

Calliostoma stirophorum is a species of sea snail, a marine gastropod mollusk in the family Calliostomatidae.

== Description ==
The height of the shell attains 7.6 mm. The small shell has a conical shape. It is scalar and inflated on the base. The six whorls are angulated, with three strong carinae near the periphery. Its color is white over nacre.

Sculpture: spirals—At the periphery is a sharp flange-like carina. Above this, about one-third of the distance to the suture, is a second, almost equally strong and prominent, which forms a shoulder to the whorls. The space between this and the suture is divided pretty equally by two threads, the lower of which is feeble. On the upper whorls all of these are closely beaded, on the body whorl only the two highest are so. Below the carina is another remote strong thread, which meets the outer lip. Within it is another, not quite so strong or so distant. Occupying the space from this to the middle are five flat close-set threads, followed by three rather more separated and roughly beaded threads. The innermost of which, like a twisted cable, forms a sort of columella with a chink between it and the sharp edge of the columellar region of the inner lip, and advances into a small tooth at the angle where it joins the outer lip on the base.

Longitudinals—The whole surface is roughened by rather coarse oblique lines of growth, which on the upper whorls appear as oblique, reticulating ribs. The color of the shell is white, with a translucent calcareous layer over nacre. The spire is rather high and scalar. The apex is a little flattened down and rounded. The minute rounded embryonic 11 whorls scarcely rise above the level. The six whorls show a rather rapid increase, with a narrow flat shelf below the suture, thence sloping flatly to the shoulder carina, from which point the contour line descends perpendicularly. The base of the shell is inflated at the edge and flattened in the middle. The suture is deeply impressed between the narrow flat shelf below and the overhanging carina above. The aperture is slightly oblique, but with a perpendicular columella, round, and nacreous within. The outer lip is thin, transparently porcelaneous on the edge, but thickened by nacre within. The columellar region of the inner lip is perpendicular, rounded within the aperture, advancing to a sharp point in front, slightly reverted but not appressed, having a small open furrow and a minute umbilical chink behind it.

This species extremely resembles Calliostoma occidentale (Mighels & C. B. Adams, 1842), but it is smaller and broader in proportion, with a less high spire. The apex is not sharp and projecting, but flattened down and rounded. The whorls are much more scalar, and of more rapid increase. The base is more tumid on its outer edge and more rounded. The apex is ornamented with a microscopic and quite irregular inlaid work of angular depressions, parted by very narrow interrupted raised lines. Whereas in that species the ornamentation is like honeycomb, with relatively large, nearly regular hexagonal pits and raised flat borders. The threads on the base are approximate, not parted in the middle by a smooth zone, and the columellar region of the inner lip is not appressed as in that species. The outer lip, too, is thickened within by the layer of nacre. ( Watson.)

== Distribution ==
This marine species occurs off Puerto Rico and in the Atlantic Ocean off Georgia, USA, at depths between 713 m and 805 m.
