= Calliostoma bellatrix =

Scientific classification
- Kingdom: Animalia
- Phylum: Mollusca
- Class: Gastropoda
- Subclass: Vetigastropoda
- Order: Trochida
- Family: Calliostomatidae
- Genus: Calliostoma
- Species: C. bellatrix

Binomial name
- Calliostoma bellatrix Willan, 2002

Species of gastropod

Calliostoma bellatrix is a species of sea snail, a marine gastropod mollusk in the family Calliostomatidae.

Some authors place this taxon in the subgenus Calliostoma (Ampullotrochus)

== Description ==
The height of the shell attains 30 mm.

== Distribution ==
This species occurs in the Arafura Sea.
