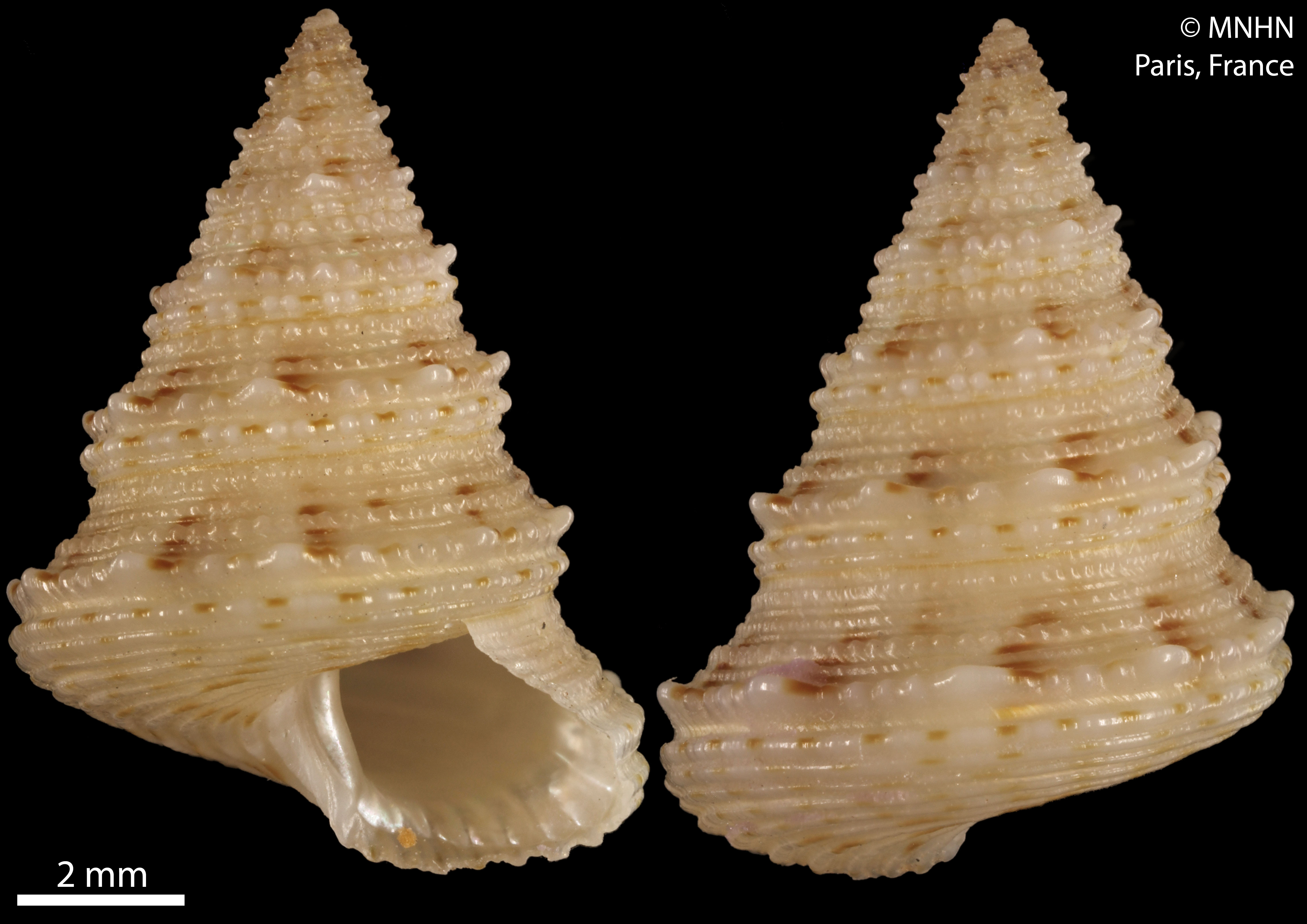
- Shell of Calliostoma dedonderi (paratype at MNHN, Paris)

Scientific classification
- Kingdom: Animalia
- Phylum: Mollusca
- Class: Gastropoda
- Subclass: Vetigastropoda
- Order: Trochida
- Family: Calliostomatidae
- Genus: Calliostoma
- Species: C. dedonderi

Binomial name
- Calliostoma dedonderi Vilvens, 2000

= Calliostoma dedonderi =

Species of gastropod

Calliostoma dedonderi is a species of sea snail, a marine gastropod mollusk in the family Calliostomatidae.

Some authors place this taxon in the subgenus Calliostoma (Ampullotrochus).

== Description ==
The size of the shell varies between 6 mm and 14 mm.

== Distribution ==
This marine species occurs off the Philippines.
