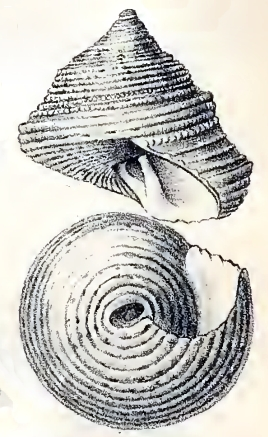
- Drawing with two views of a shell of Calliostoma yucatecanum

Scientific classification
- Kingdom: Animalia
- Phylum: Mollusca
- Class: Gastropoda
- Subclass: Vetigastropoda
- Order: Trochida
- Family: Calliostomatidae
- Genus: Calliostoma
- Species: C. yucatecanum

Binomial name
- Calliostoma yucatecanum Dall, 1881

Synonyms
- Calliostoma (Astele) agalma Schwengel, 1942

= Calliostoma yucatecanum =

Species of gastropod

Calliostoma yucatecanum, common name the depressed top shell, is a species of sea snail, a marine gastropod mollusk in the family Calliostomatidae.

== Description ==
The size of the shell varies between 6 mm and 16 mm. The shell has a depressed conic shape with a rather acute apex and six whorls. The nucleus is white and delicately sculptured. The remainder of the shell is whitish with faint streaks of brown transverse to the whorls, arranged so as to present the appearance of seven brownish streaks radiating from the apex. Other dots and streaks of brown are irregularly distributed. The upper side of the whorls contain one smooth revolving keel nearly midway between the sutures, but a little nearer the periphery. This gives the whorls a somewhat tabulated aspect. Above this on the body whorl are four smaller more or less beaded or crenulated keels, below it are two without nodosities, reaching the gently rounded periphery. Between these are intercalary threads or grooves. The base of the shell is supplied with nine rounded revolving ribs, those nearer the umbilicus with a tendency to beading. The interspaces are about as wide as the ribs, which are crossed by slight elevations due to lines of growth. The umbilicus is perforate, bordered by a strong white rib. The inner wall is smooth or transversely striate. The columella is emarginate, twisted, not thickened, ending in a round lump above the basal margin of the aperture. The oblique aperture is subrectangular, nacreous, sharp-edged, and crenulated by the ribs. The operculum is as usual in the genus.

== Distribution ==
This species occurs in the Caribbean Sea and the Gulf of Mexico at depths between 8 m and 1170 m.
