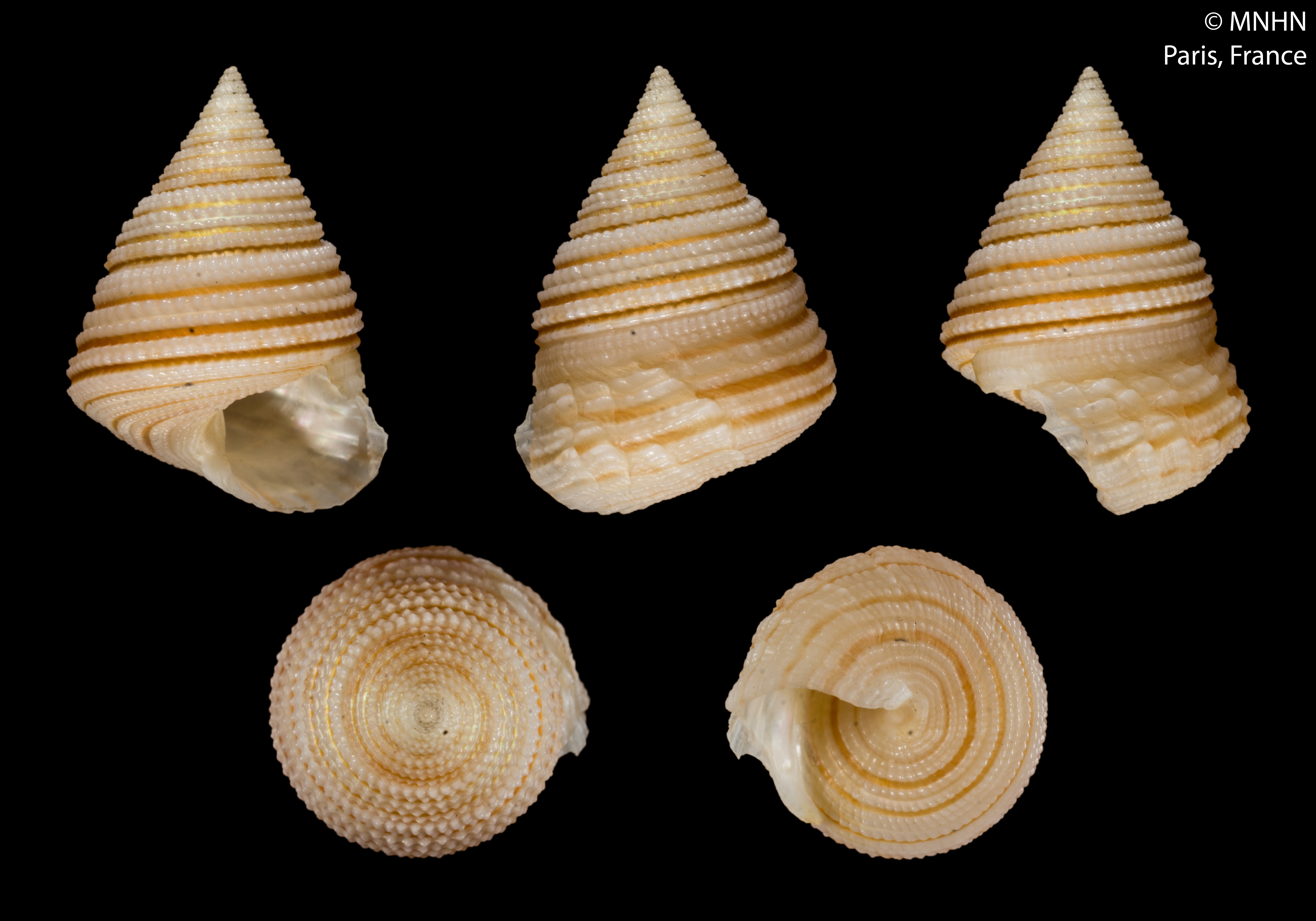
- Shell of Calliostoma chinoi (holotype at MNHN, Paris)

Scientific classification
- Kingdom: Animalia
- Phylum: Mollusca
- Class: Gastropoda
- Subclass: Vetigastropoda
- Order: Trochida
- Family: Calliostomatidae
- Genus: Calliostoma
- Species: C. chinoi

Binomial name
- Calliostoma chinoi Poppe, Tagaro & Dekker, 2006

= Calliostoma chinoi =

Species of gastropod

Calliostoma chinoi is an average-sized deepwater sea snail, a marine gastropod mollusc in the family Calliostomatidae.

== Distribution ==
This species is endemic to the Philippines. It is found near Davao, Talikud Island, Mindanao.

== Habitat ==
This top shell lives at depths of about 140 m.

== Shell description ==
The shell is globose, conical, first whorls are straight and later are a little convex spire outlines. There are six and a half whorls.

The external shell coloration are set in three groups of two and in between there is a channel which is covered with oblique striae and brown colored, while the spiral knob rows are white.

The shell height is up to 13 mm, and the width is up to 13 mm.
