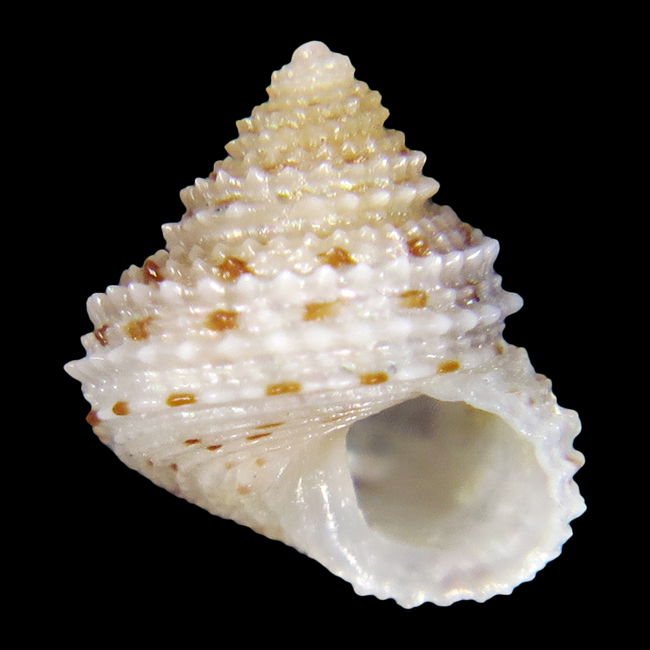

Scientific classification
- Kingdom: Animalia
- Phylum: Mollusca
- Class: Gastropoda
- Subclass: Vetigastropoda
- Order: Trochida
- Family: Calliostomatidae
- Genus: Calliostoma
- Species: C. guphili

Binomial name
- Calliostoma guphili Poppe, 2004

= Calliostoma guphili =

Species of gastropod

Calliostoma guphili is a species of sea snail, a marine gastropod mollusk in the family Calliostomatidae.

== Description ==
The size of the shell varies between 4 mm and 6 mm.

== Distribution ==
This marine species occurs off the Philippines.
