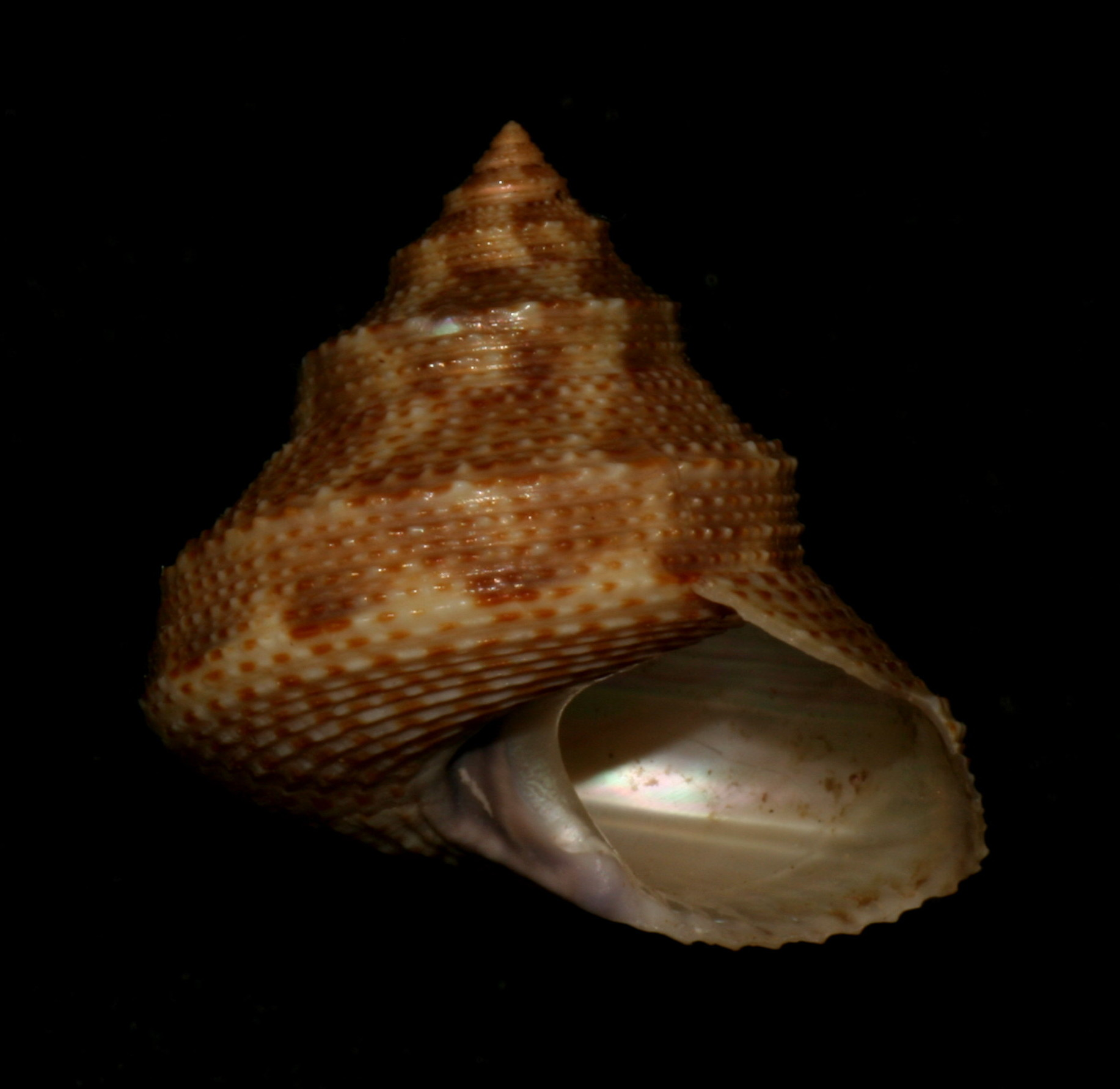
- A shell of Calliostoma bonita Strong, Hanna & Hertlein, 1933, 22.7 mm height by 23.0 mm diameter, dredged from a depth of 35 to 45 fathoms (64–82 meters) offshore near Toscalota, Mexico

Scientific classification
- Kingdom: Animalia
- Phylum: Mollusca
- Class: Gastropoda
- Subclass: Vetigastropoda
- Order: Trochida
- Family: Calliostomatidae
- Genus: Calliostoma
- Species: C. bonita

Binomial name
- Calliostoma bonita Strong, Hanna & Hertlein, 1933

= Calliostoma bonita =

Species of gastropod

Calliostoma bonita, common name the kelp top shell, is a species of sea snail, a marine gastropod mollusk in the family Calliostomatidae.

== Description ==
The shell has a concave shoulder with a strong carination. Overall the shell is light brown to tan in color, with a bright purple channel at the edge of the inner lip. The sculpture consists of smooth spiral threads which show darker brown spots. Average size: height 23 mm, diameter 24 mm. Compare with the similar Calliostoma palmeri. Despite the range overlap there is no known intergradation between Calliostoma palmeri and C. bonita and the two species are considered to be distinct but closely related, making them sibling species.

== Distribution ==
This is a Panamic Province species which generally occurs from Mazatlan, Mexico to Acapulco, Mexico, and is found subtidally in deep water from 37 to 73 meters.
