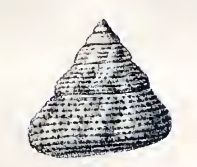
- Drawing of a shell of Calliostoma euglyptum

Scientific classification
- Kingdom: Animalia
- Phylum: Mollusca
- Class: Gastropoda
- Subclass: Vetigastropoda
- Order: Trochida
- Family: Calliostomatidae
- Genus: Calliostoma
- Species: C. euglyptum

Binomial name
- Calliostoma euglyptum (A. Adams, 1855)

Synonyms
- Ziziphinus euglyptus A. Adams, 1855 (original description)

= Calliostoma euglyptum =

Species of gastropod

Calliostoma euglyptum, common name the sculptured top shell, is a species of sea snail, a marine gastropod mollusk in the family Calliostomatidae.

== Description ==
The size of the shell varies between 12 mm and 26 mm. The solid, imperforate shell has a conical shape. It is pinkish with darker flames above alternating with short white stripes or spots radiating from the sutures. The spire is rather straight conic. The apex is dark red. The six whorls are nearly flat. They are encircled by numerous narrow finely beaded lirae. The interstices on the lower whorl show minute beaded threads. There are about 7 principal lirae on the penultimate whorl, about the same number on the next earlier. The body whorl is bluntly angled. The base of the shell is unicolored pinkish, nearly flat, with about a dozen narrow beaded lirae. There is a small white tract around the axis. The quadrate aperture is silvery inside. The outer lip is slightly crenulate inside. The oblique columella is cylindrical, and a little swollen at its base.

This species varies in color from dark rose to yellowish-white, sometimes unicolor, sometimes variegated with whitish clouds radiating from the invariably purplish apex. It is the commoner imperforate species of Florida, often collected by tourists.

== Distribution ==
This species occurs in the Caribbean Sea, the Gulf of Mexico and in the Atlantic Ocean off North Carolina to Florida, USA
