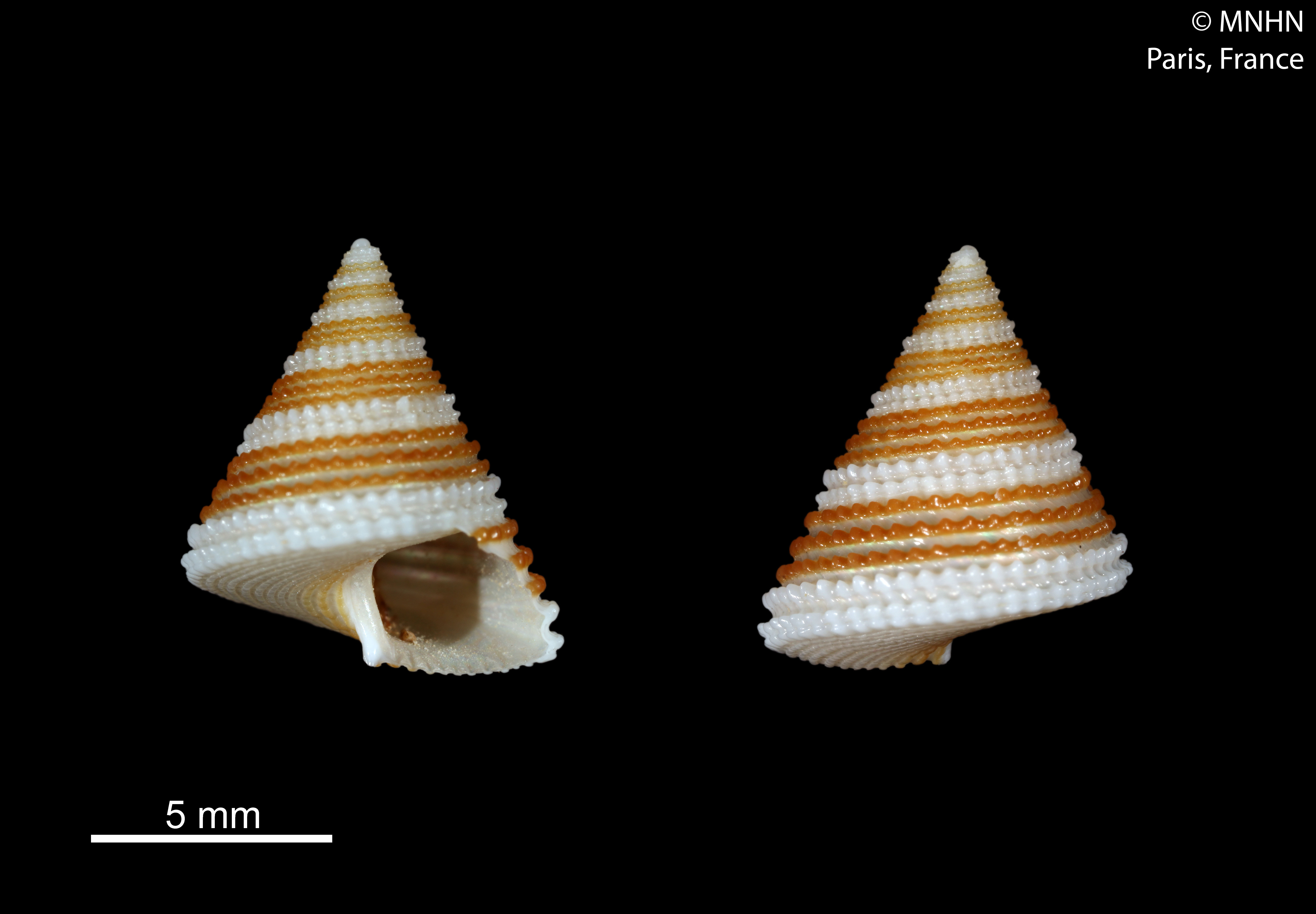
- Shell of Calliostoma philippei (specimen at MNHN, Paris)

Scientific classification
- Kingdom: Animalia
- Phylum: Mollusca
- Class: Gastropoda
- Subclass: Vetigastropoda
- Order: Trochida
- Family: Calliostomatidae
- Genus: Calliostoma
- Species: C. philippei

Binomial name
- Calliostoma philippei Poppe, 2004

Synonyms
- Calliostoma (Ampullotrochus) philippei Poppe, 2004

= Calliostoma philippei =

Species of gastropod

Calliostoma philippei is a species of sea snail, a marine gastropod mollusk in the family Calliostomatidae.

It belongs to the genus Calliostoma, a group commonly known as top snails due to their typically conical shell shape. Like other members of the family, the species possesses a calcareous shell and inhabits marine environments. Taxonomic placement of C. philippei follows the classification of the superfamily Trochoidea within the clade Vetigastropoda. Detailed information regarding its morphology, distribution, and ecology is documented in malacological catalogues and marine biodiversity databases.

== Description ==
The size of the shell varies between 8 mm and 17 mm.

== Distribution ==
This marine species occurs off the Philippines.
