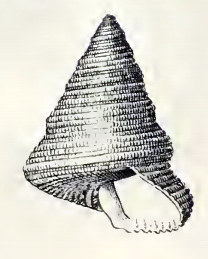
- Original drawing of a shell of Calliostoma roseolum

Scientific classification
- Kingdom: Animalia
- Phylum: Mollusca
- Class: Gastropoda
- Subclass: Vetigastropoda
- Order: Trochida
- Family: Calliostomatidae
- Genus: Calliostoma
- Species: C. roseolum

Binomial name
- Calliostoma roseolum Dall, 1881

= Calliostoma roseolum =

Species of gastropod

Calliostoma roseolum, common name Dall's rosy top shell, is a species of sea snail, a marine gastropod mollusk in the family Calliostomatidae.

== Description ==
The size of the shell varies between 7 mm and 20 mm. The acute conical shell contains eight whorls. The first five whorls are flattened, the last three somewhat rounded. The periphery of body whorl is gently rounded to meet the rather flattened base. There is no umbilicus. The columella is short, straight, and ending in a slight knob inside the margin of the aperture. The aperture is crenulated by the sculpture, nacreous, obliquely set and subrectangular in form. The sutures are appressed, hardly visible except in the last three whorls. The color of the shell is delicate rosy, the nucleus smooth and white. The base of the shell has about twelve equal revolving ribs consisting of successive rounded nodules, of even size, somewhat like strings of beads. The first, third, and fifth ribs, counting from the columella, show every third bead crimson, the others white. The other basal ribs have the rosy color of the shell, but in the seventh, ninth, and eleventh, each alternate or each third bead has a deeper crimson tint, though this is hardly visible without a glass. On the upper surface of the whorls are (eight in the body whorl) similar beaded ribs, several of which have rosy threads alternating with crimson ones. The general rosy hue is clouded darker and lighter alternately, but in an indefinite way. The sculpture of the whole shell is very uniform. The nucleus is reversed and more or less immersed.

== Distribution ==
This species occurs in the Gulf of Mexico and in the Caribbean Sea, the West Indies and in the Atlantic Ocean off North Carolina, USA. Sometimes taken in lobster traps at 180 feet depth.
