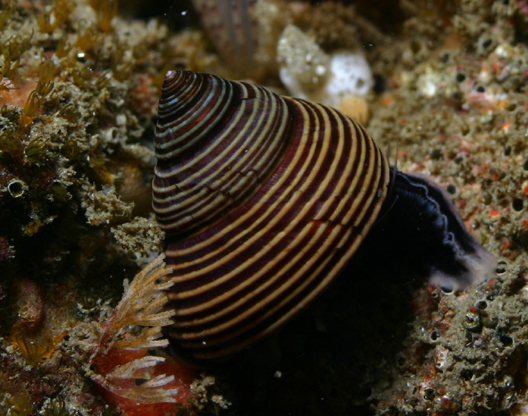
- A living specimen of Calliostoma ligatum crawling on a rocky substrate

Scientific classification
- Kingdom: Animalia
- Phylum: Mollusca
- Class: Gastropoda
- Subclass: Vetigastropoda
- Order: Trochida
- Family: Calliostomatidae
- Genus: Calliostoma
- Species: C. ligatum

Binomial name
- Calliostoma ligatum (Gould, 1849)

Synonyms
- Calliostoma costatum Martyn, T., 1784; Calliostoma splendens Carpenter; Trochus castaneus (Nuttall ms) Forbes, Trochus costatus Martyn, 1784; Trochus filosus Wood; Trochus ligatus Gould, 1849 (basionym); Zizyphinus filosus Wood

= Calliostoma ligatum =

Species of gastropod

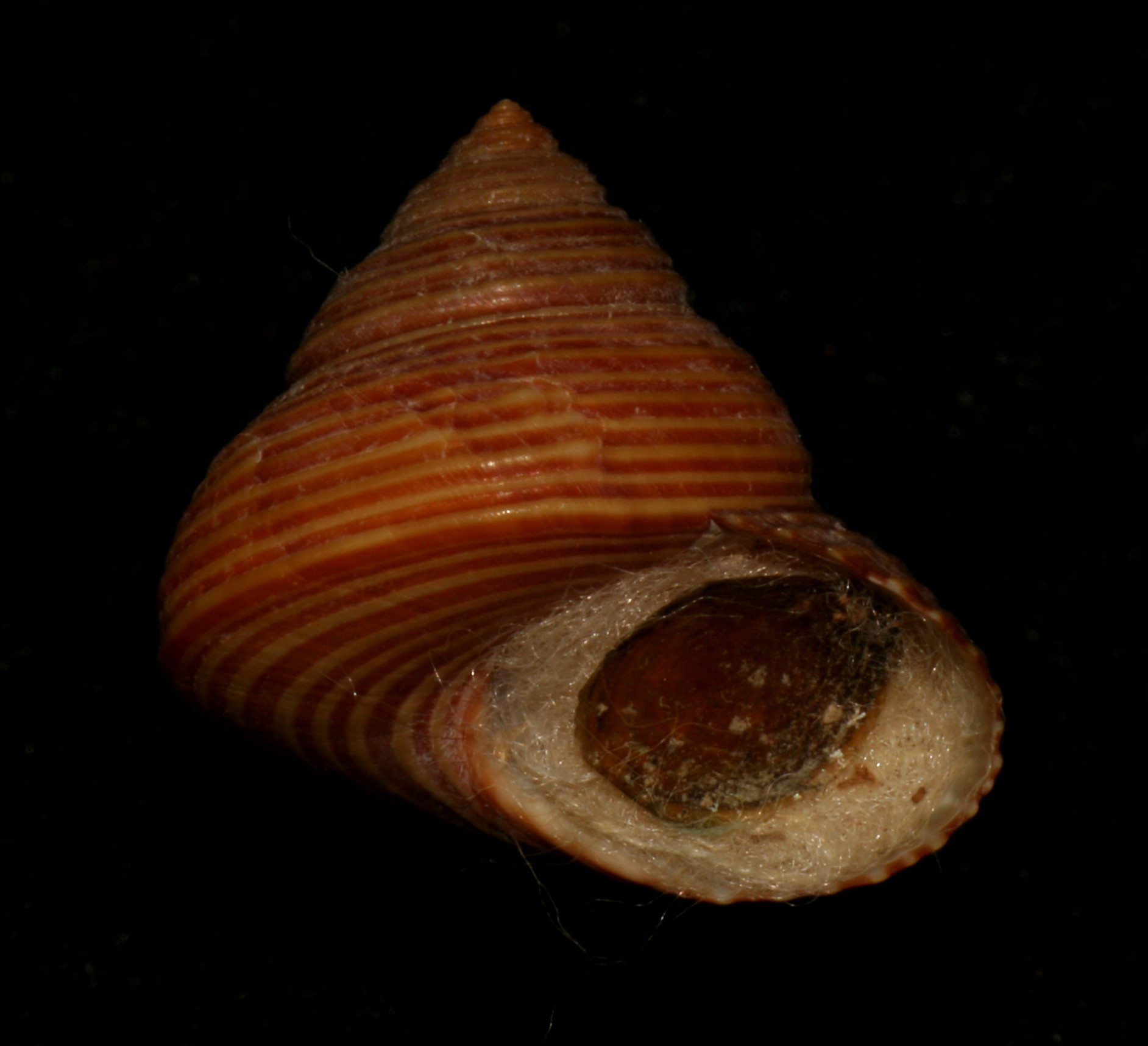
Shell and operculum of Calliostoma ligatum (Gould, 1849)

Calliostoma ligatum, common name the blue top snail, is a small prosobranch trochid gastropod mollusk in the family Calliostomatidae, the Calliostoma top snails.

== Description ==
The conical, solid shell has well-rounded globose whorls with six to eight smooth spiral cords per whorl and no umbilicus. Its base is flattened. The surface is encircled by numerous spiral smooth riblets, their interstices closely finely obliquely striate. There are usually seven to nine riblets on the penultimate whorl, about nine on the base. The spire is conic. The apex is acute. The sutures are impressed. There are about seven, convex whorls. The body whorl is rounded (or a trifle angled) around the lower part, slightly convex beneath. The oblique aperture is rounded. The outer lip is fluted within, with a beveled opaque white submargin. The throat is pearly and iridescent;. The simple columella is arcuate.

The base color is chocolate brown to mauve with light tan raised cords, and the aperture is pearly white. The apex is darked and usually purple.

The shell is relatively heavy for its size, and its length and width are roughly equal. Length and width up to 24 mm.

== Distribution ==
Found from Alaska to San Diego, California.

== Reproduction and development ==
Calliostoma ligatum is a broadcast spawner. Snails spawned in the laboratory in the San Juan Islands, WA, USA, during the months of February, March, and April, but only in water that was at least 10 °C. Females release eggs in delicate strands of mucus that break down soon after release. These strands are 1-3mm wide and contain 1-4 eggs across the strand. Ten to ninety eggs are released per pulse, with multiple pulses of eggs released during each spawning event. Males release sperm as a milky white cloud. Fertilization occurs in the water. Eggs are just over 200 um in diameter, and an egg with its protective gelatinous chorion is about 750 um in diameter. Early development proceeds as the zygote undergoes cleavage in the spiral pattern typical of molluscs and other protostomes. Embryos in culture at 7-9 °C reach the trochophore larval stage in 3 days, undergo torsion in 4.5–5 days, and hatch 6 days after fertilization. Veliger larvae stop swimming and begin crawling 9.5 days after fertilization and undergo metamorphosis into juvenile snails about 12 days after fertilization.

== Ecology and behavior ==
This snail is found frequently on rocks in the low intertidal zone and in the shallow subtidal zone on large kelp, especially the giant kelp Macrocystis. Calliostoma eats a variety of items including the kelp it lives on as well as small sessile organisms and other material that live on rocks or kelp surfaces, including bryozoans, hydroids, diatoms, and detritus.

This snail shows a remarkable range of behavioral reactions to other animals. Snails displayed a flight response with movement rates up to 10 cm/min, often accompanied by shell twisting, between 70% and 100% of the time after contact with the following predatory seastars: Leptasterias hexactis, Pycnopodia helianthoides, Pisaster ochraceus, and Evasterias troschelii. Snails either withdrew into their shells, turned away, or fled after contact with the subtidal crab Cancer oregonensis. C. ligatum showed only a weak response to contact with predatory snails, but Fusitriton oregonensis elicited the strongest response of any snail tested. Contact with F. oregonensis caused about half of the test subjects to exhibit a flight response while others either bit the predator with their radula, simply turned away, or showed no response.

C. ligatum frequently uses its radula to rasp on, i.e., bite, its non-predators. C.ligatum bit the non-predatory seastar Henricia leviuscula every time they came into contact with each other. After making initial contact the snail reared up, extended its head forward and visibly rasped the upper body wall of H. leviuscula with its radula. This caused the sea star to move off. C. ligatum similarly uses its radula to bite, i.e., rasp, on the seastars Solaster stimpsoni about 60% of the time, and Dermasterias imbricata about 40% of the time. C. ligatum also routinely bit (rasped) the snails Ceratostoma foliatum, Searlesia dira and Amphissa columbiana which caused these snails to move away from C. ligatum.
