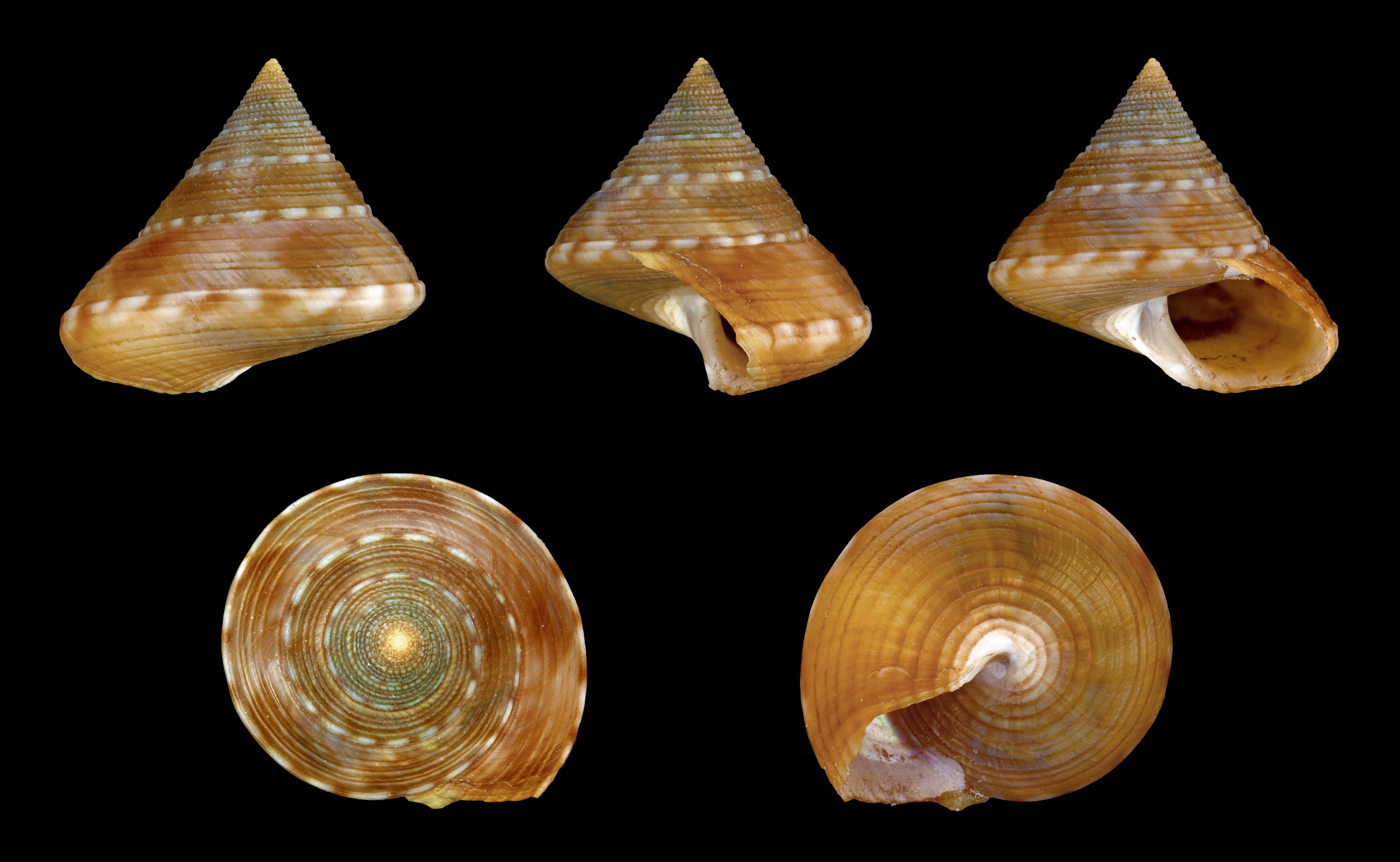
- Five views of a shell of Calliostoma zizyphinum

Scientific classification
- Kingdom: Animalia
- Phylum: Mollusca
- Class: Gastropoda
- Subclass: Vetigastropoda
- Order: Trochida
- Family: Calliostomatidae
- Genus: Calliostoma
- Species: C. zizyphinum

Binomial name
- Calliostoma zizyphinum (Linnaeus, 1758)

Synonyms
- Calliostoma conuloide (Lamarck, 1822); Calliostoma (Calliostoma) zizyphinum zizyphinum (Linnaeus, 1758); Calliostoma zizyphinum var. lyonsi (Leach in Forbes & Hanley, 1850); Trochus cingulatus Brocchi; Trochus conuloides Lamarck, 1822; Trochus discrepans Brown; Trochus polymorphus Cantraine, 1835; Trochus zizyphinus Linnaeus, 1758; Ziziphinus albidus Wood; Ziziphinus vulgaris Gray, J.E., 1851; Ziziphinus zizyphinus Linnaeus, C., 1758; Zizyphinus conuloides Lamarck, 1822; Zizyphinus demissus Monterosato, 1884; Zizyphinus typus Nardo, 1847

= Calliostoma zizyphinum =

Species of gastropod

Calliostoma zizyphinum, common name the European painted top shell, is a species of sea snail, a marine gastropod mollusk in the family Calliostomatidae.

== Description ==
The solid, regularly conical shell is straight-sided and imperforate. The shell contains up to 12–13 whorls. It is sculptured with regular spiral grooves and ridges, traversed by fine prosocline growth lines. The apex is minute, composed of a single smooth rounded whorl, Several whorls follow, each with 4 granose spiral ridges. These become smooth and either obsolete or narrow on the later whorls. The body whorl has a prominent peripheral keel bearing two broad ridges; ridges above suture in preceding whorls. Base of shell rather flat, inner lips reflected over shallow umbilical groove. The periphery is angular, encircled by a smooth rounded rib that becomes a supra-sutural band or fasciole on the spire. The base of the shell is nearly flat. The aperture is quadrate. The cylindrical columella is nearly straight.

The color of the shell is variable. The ground color is yellowish brown, pale pink, or violet with streaks and blotches of brown, red or purple on the periphery. Blotches on the keel are generally darker, more frequent and more regular than on other parts of shell. It is radiately clouded with brown on the upper surface. The base of the shell is unicolored or obscurely radiately streaked. Pure white or violet specimens are occasionally found.

== Parasites ==
This species is host to the following parasites:

- Trochicola entericus Dollfus, 1914 (ectoparasitic copepod)
- Endocheres obscurus Bocquet & Stock, 1956 ( ectoparasitic copepod)
- Trochicola enterica Dollfus, 1914 (endoparasitic copepod)

== Predators ==
The starfish Asterias rubens is a known predator of Calliostoma zizyphinus

== Distribution ==
This marine species occurs in European waters from Northern Norway to the Azores; in the Mediterranean Sea.
