= Bathybembix galapagana =

Scientific classification
- Kingdom: Animalia
- Phylum: Mollusca
- Class: Gastropoda
- Subclass: Vetigastropoda
- Family: Calliotropidae
- Genus: Bathybembix
- Species: B. galapagana

Binomial name
- Bathybembix galapagana (Dall, 1908)

Synonyms
- Solariella galapagana Dall, 1908

Species of gastropod

Bathybembix galapagana is a species of sea snail, a marine gastropod mollusk in the family Calliotropidae.
