= Bathybembix drakei =

Scientific classification
- Kingdom: Animalia
- Phylum: Mollusca
- Class: Gastropoda
- Subclass: Vetigastropoda
- Family: Calliotropidae
- Genus: Bathybembix
- Species: B. drakei

Binomial name
- Bathybembix drakei Dell, 1990

Species of gastropod

Bathybembix drakei is a species of deep-water sea snail, a marine gastropod mollusk in the family Calliotropidae.

== Description ==
The shell grows to a length of 23.5 mm.

== Distribution ==
This marine species occurs off the Drake Passage, Antarctica at a depth of 3400 m.
