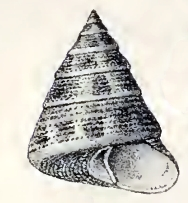
- Drawing with an apertural view of a shell of Calliostoma jujubinum

Scientific classification
- Kingdom: Animalia
- Phylum: Mollusca
- Class: Gastropoda
- Subclass: Vetigastropoda
- Order: Trochida
- Family: Calliostomatidae
- Genus: Calliostoma
- Species: C. jujubinum

Binomial name
- Calliostoma jujubinum (Gmelin, 1791)

Synonyms
- Calliostoma perspectivum Koch, F.C.L. in Philippi, R.A., 1843; Calliostoma prejujubinum Olsson, A.A. & A. Harbison, 1953 (fossil); Eutrochus alternatus Sowerby III, 1873; Trochus jujubinus Gmelin, 1791 (original combination); Trochus lunatus Röding, 1798; Trochus perspectivus Koch, 1843; Calliostoma rawsoni Dall, W.H., 1889; Zizyphinus jujubinum (Gmelin, 1791)

= Calliostoma jujubinum =

Species of gastropod

Calliostoma jujubinum, common name the jujube top shell, is a species of sea snail, a marine gastropod mollusk in the family Calliostomatidae.

== Description ==
The size of the shell varies between 13 mm and 34 mm. The solid, heavy shell has a pyramidal-conic shape. It has a narrowly perforate funnel-shaped umbilicus. Its color is chestnut-brown, purple-brown on the upper whorls. It is marked with narrow, curved, rather widely separated longitudinal white streaks. The base of the shell is minutely dotted with white. The sculpture consists of numerous little-elevated spiral beaded lirulae, with many spiral striae between them. The base is flat and has coarser concentric subgranulose lirae, becoming finer toward the outer margin. The spire was elevated. There are about 10 whorls, concave above, swollen and projecting at the periphery, the last obtusely angled. The oblique aperture is quadrate. The outer lip is beveled, strongly 5 or 6 lirate within. The basal lip is straight, very thick, obtuse, crenulate, lirate inside. The columella is arcuate, ending below in a point or tooth. The umbilicus is white within. The young specimens have a minute smooth, rounded, rather elevated dextral nucleus, and bicingulate periphery.

== Distribution ==
This species occurs in the Gulf of Mexico, the Caribbean Sea and off the Lesser Antilles; in the Atlantic Ocean from North Carolina to Southern Brazil at depths between 0 m and 192 m.
