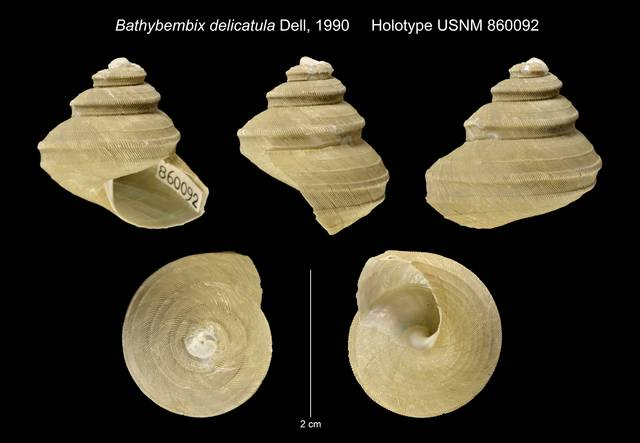

Scientific classification
- Kingdom: Animalia
- Phylum: Mollusca
- Class: Gastropoda
- Subclass: Vetigastropoda
- Family: Calliotropidae
- Genus: Bathybembix
- Species: B. delicatula

Binomial name
- Bathybembix delicatula Dell, 1990

= Bathybembix delicatula =

Species of gastropod

Bathybembix delicatula is a species of deep-water sea snail, a marine gastropod mollusc in the family Calliotropidae.

== Description ==
The shell grows to a height of 23 mm.

== Distribution ==
This species occurs in Antarctic waters.
