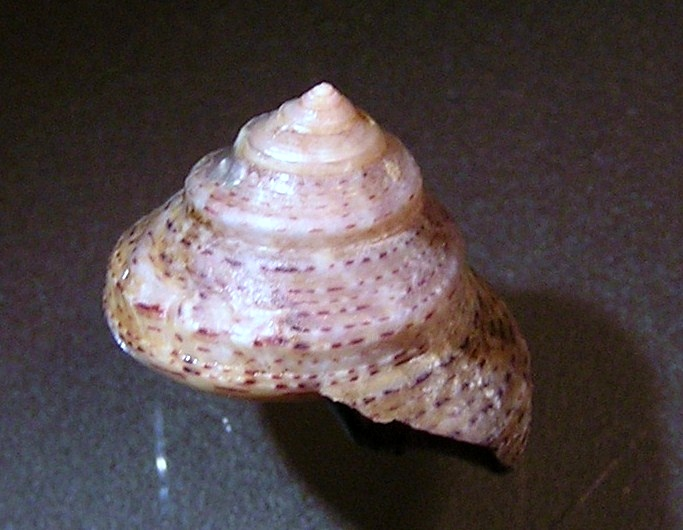
- Apertural view of a shell of Calliostoma eximium

Scientific classification
- Kingdom: Animalia
- Phylum: Mollusca
- Class: Gastropoda
- Subclass: Vetigastropoda
- Order: Trochida
- Family: Calliostomatidae
- Subfamily: Calliostomatinae
- Genus: Calliostoma
- Species: C. eximium

Binomial name
- Calliostoma eximium (Reeve, 1843)

Synonyms
- Trochus ceratus Fischer; Trochus eximius Reeve, 1842; Trochus versicolor Menke; Zizyphinus eximius Reeve, 1863

= Calliostoma eximium =

Species of gastropod

Calliostoma eximium is a species of sea snail, a marine gastropod mollusk in the family Calliostomatidae.

== Description ==
The height of the conical shell varies between 15 mm and 25 mm. It is imperforate, rather solid and strong. It is light yellowish or grayish, with irregular bluish-black longitudinal maculations and streaks. The base of the shell is dotted or shows small maculations. The shell is sometimes without dark flames, their place taken by obscure brownish clouding. The larger spiral cords both above and below are articulated with deep red. There are about 8 whorls, each one more or less markedly biangular at the circumference. The lower angle is obtuse, concealed by the suture on the spire. The upper angle is acute, continuing nearly to the apex. The whorls are concave above, slightly excavated around the periphery, a little convex beneath. They are encircled by numerous unequal spiral threads, the larger ones beaded, the smaller irregularly crenated by rather decided incremental striae. The base of the shell is radiately striate, with about 8 to 12 smooth spirals, their interstices without secondary riblets. The oblique aperture is rhomboidal. The smooth columella is heavy. Its face is concave, and obtusely subdentate at its base.

== Distribution ==
This species occurs in the Pacific Ocean from Baja California to Peru.
