= Bathybembix abyssorum =

Scientific classification
- Kingdom: Animalia
- Phylum: Mollusca
- Class: Gastropoda
- Subclass: Vetigastropoda
- Family: Calliotropidae
- Genus: Bathybembix
- Species: B. abyssorum

Binomial name
- Bathybembix abyssorum (Smith, 1891)

Species of gastropod

Bathybembix abyssorum is a species of sea snail, a marine gastropod mollusc in the family Calliotropidae.

== Distribution ==
This species occurs in the Indo-Pacific.
