= Bathybembix aeola =

Scientific classification
- Kingdom: Animalia
- Phylum: Mollusca
- Class: Gastropoda
- Subclass: Vetigastropoda
- Family: Calliotropidae
- Genus: Bathybembix
- Species: B. aeola

Binomial name
- Bathybembix aeola (Watson, 1879)

Synonyms
- Bembix aeola Watson, 1879 (original combination)

Species of gastropod

Bathybembix aeola, common name the changing margarite, is a species of sea snail, a marine gastropod mollusc in the family Calliotropidae.

== Description ==
The size of the shell varies between 40 mm and 50 mm.

(Original description by Watson) The high shell is concavely conical. It is carinated, sculptured on the upper whorls, and smooth or wrinkled below. It is thin, with a tumid lirated base. It is narrowly umbilicated, with a smooth epidermis, thin, but especially so on the base. The shell is more or less nacreous all over under a thin porcellanous upper layer.

Sculpture: The first three whorls (after the embryonic apex) are reticulated by three sharp remote spirals, and rather stronger, slightly oblique longitudinals, which rise at their intersection into small sharp pyramidal tubercles. The interstices are a little broader than high. This system gradually dies out and leaves the surface smooth, only the row of infrasutural tubercles survives in an enlarged but depressed form. And springing from these some sinuous oblique and slightly irregular longitudinal puckerings appear on the body whorl, which is nearly bisected by the sharpish, slightly expressed, finely tubercled carina. This bisection of the body whorl arises from the great prolongation and tumidity of the base On this base, below the carina, are five narrow, equally parted, spiral threads, and two intra-umbilical ones, which are more contiguous. Besides this larger system of sculpture, the whole surface is covered with minute, oblique, irregular, and interrupted puckerings of the epidermis.

Colour: Theshell has a brownish yellow colour, but below the epidermis there is a thin pure white porcellanous layer, through which and the epidermis the sheen of the nacreous layer gleams. The base is whiter, the epidermis there being very thin. Inside, the aperture shows an exquisite roseate nacre.

The spire is high, with a slightly concave contour, the lines of which are hardly swollen out by the slight tumidity of the body whorl. The apex is eroded, but evidently small. The shell contains 7 or 8 whorls, of regular increase, quite flat, except the last, which is very slightly constricted below the suture, a very little tumid on the upper slope, sharply carinated but not much angulated at the suture, and very tumid on the base. The suture is linear, strongly defined above by the square furrow lying between the lines of tubercles which marginate the suture above and below. On the body whorl it becomes slightly pouting, from the projection of the carina and the slight infrasutural constriction. The nearly square aperture is very little oblique in the line of its advance, but standing out a little obliquely to the axis of the shell. The outer lip is thin, not descending. The columellar lip is thin, spread out broadly at its base over the umbilicus, which it largely conceals, with a deep narrow furrow behind it. It advances thin and pointed, curving over to the right to its angular junction with the basal lip. The umbilicus is defined by a spiral thread and with two other spirals within it. It is not so much small as concealed by the columellar lip.

== Distribution ==
This marine species occurs off Japan and East China.
