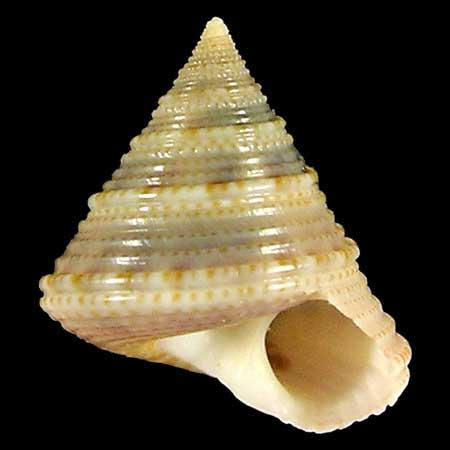
- Apertural view of the shell of Calliostoma trotini

Scientific classification
- Kingdom: Animalia
- Phylum: Mollusca
- Class: Gastropoda
- Subclass: Vetigastropoda
- Order: Trochida
- Family: Calliostomatidae
- Genus: Calliostoma
- Species: C. trotini

Binomial name
- Calliostoma trotini Poppe, Tagaro & Dekker, 2006

= Calliostoma trotini =

Species of gastropod

Calliostoma trotini is a species of sea snail, a marine gastropod mollusc in the family Calliostomatidae.

== Range of distribution ==
This species is endemic to the Philippines. It is found in Balabac Island, Palawan. It is also found in the East China Sea.

== Habitat ==
This top shell lives at depths of about 150 m.

== Shell description ==
The shell is elevated and glossy, conical with straight whorls. The protoconch is white.

Overall color is light olive with a purplish iridescent shine. There are darker blotches just above the suture, on the periphery.

The shell height varies between 8 mm and 12 mm, and the width is up to 11 mm. It is average-sized for the genus.
