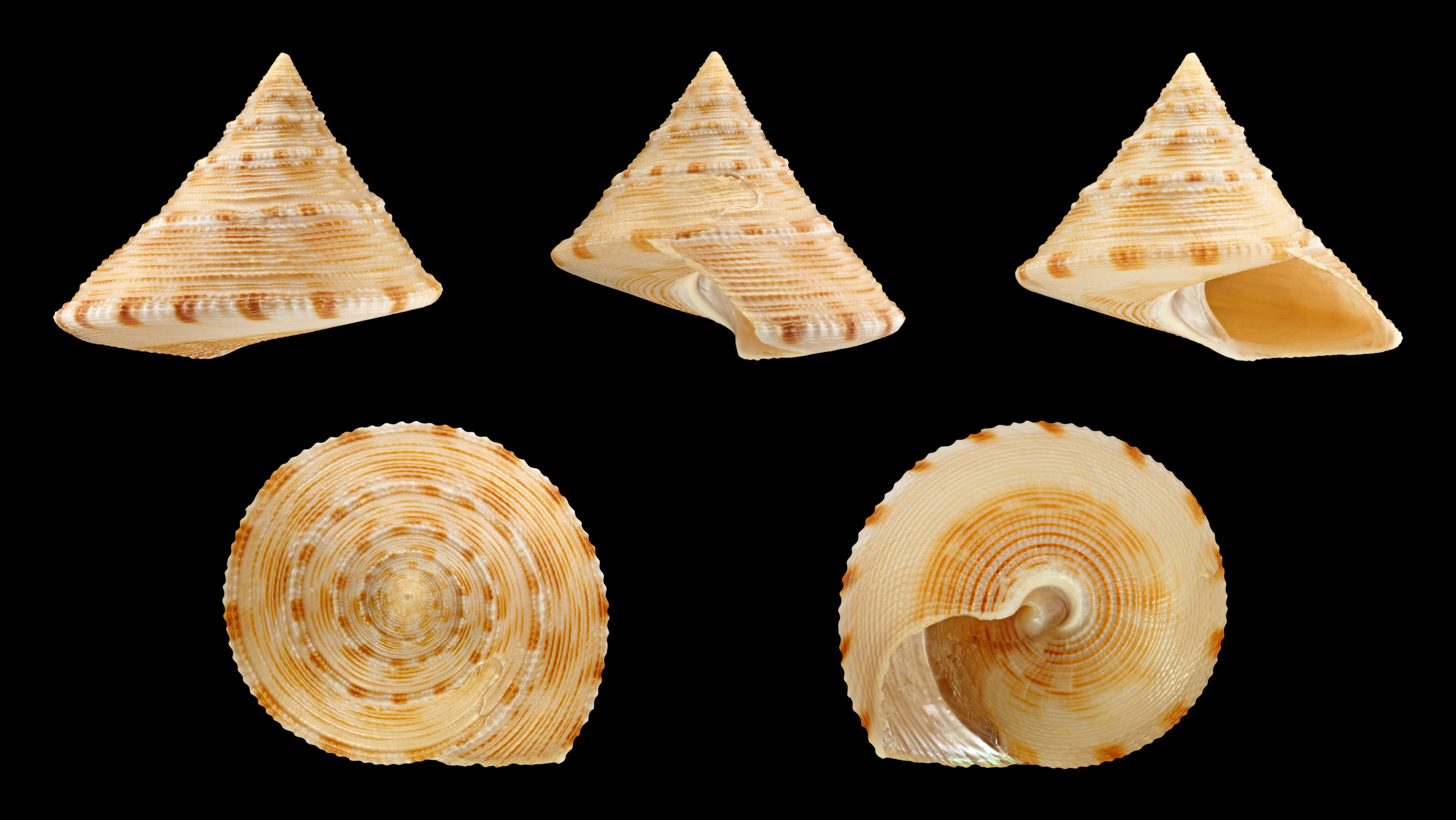

Scientific classification
- Kingdom: Animalia
- Phylum: Mollusca
- Class: Gastropoda
- Subclass: Vetigastropoda
- Order: Trochida
- Family: Calliostomatidae
- Genus: Calliostoma
- Species: C. formosense

Binomial name
- Calliostoma formosense E. A. Smith, 1907

Synonyms
- Calliostoma formosensis E. A. Smith, 1907; Calliostoma (Maurea) formosense E. A. Smith, 1907

= Calliostoma formosense =

Species of gastropod

Calliostoma formosense, common name the Formosa top shell, is a species of sea snail, a marine gastropod mollusk in the family Calliostomatidae.

Some authors place this taxon in the subgenus Calliostoma (Benthastelena).

== Description ==
The size of the shell varies between 35 mm and 63 mm.

== Distribution ==
This marine species occurs off Taiwan.
