= Calliostoma lividum =

Scientific classification
- Kingdom: Animalia
- Phylum: Mollusca
- Class: Gastropoda
- Subclass: Vetigastropoda
- Order: Trochida
- Family: Calliostomatidae
- Subfamily: Calliostomatinae
- Genus: Calliostoma
- Species: C. lividum

Binomial name
- Calliostoma lividum Dautzenberg, 1927

Synonyms
- Calliostoma conulus var. livida Dautzenberg, 1927

Species of gastropod

Calliostoma lividum is a species of sea snail, a marine gastropod mollusk in the family Calliostomatidae.

== Distribution ==
This species occurs in the following locations:

- Azores Exclusive Economic Zone
