= Bathybembix macdonaldi =

Scientific classification
- Kingdom: Animalia
- Phylum: Mollusca
- Class: Gastropoda
- Subclass: Vetigastropoda
- Family: Calliotropidae
- Genus: Bathybembix
- Species: B. macdonaldi

Binomial name
- Bathybembix macdonaldi (Dall, 1890)

Species of gastropod

Bathybembix macdonaldi is a species of sea snail, a marine gastropod mollusc in the family Calliotropidae.

== Description ==
The size of the shell varies between 25 mm and 70 mm.

== Distribution ==
This species occurs in the Pacific Ocean from Ecuador to Chile.
