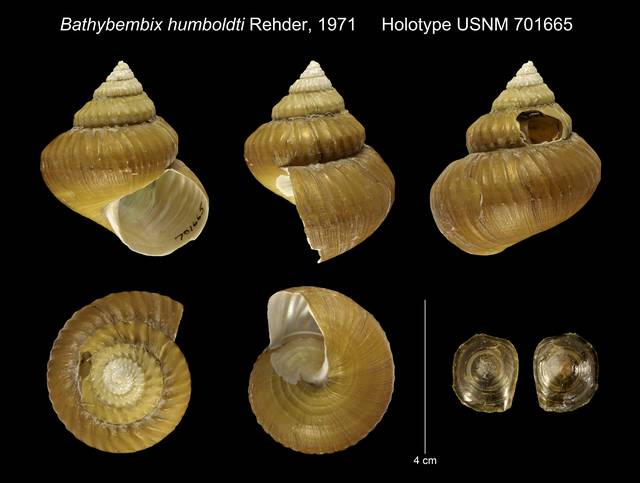

Scientific classification
- Kingdom: Animalia
- Phylum: Mollusca
- Class: Gastropoda
- Subclass: Vetigastropoda
- Family: Calliotropidae
- Genus: Bathybembix
- Species: B. humboldti

Binomial name
- Bathybembix humboldti Rehder, 1971

= Bathybembix humboldti =

Species of gastropod

Bathybembix humboldti, common name Humboldt's margarite, is a species of sea snail, a marine gastropod mollusk in the family Calliotropidae.

== Description ==
The size of the shell varies between 40 mm and 55 mm.

== Distribution ==
This deepwater species occurs in the Pacific Ocean off Chile.
