= Calliotropis equatorialis =

Scientific classification
- Kingdom: Animalia
- Phylum: Mollusca
- Class: Gastropoda
- Subclass: Vetigastropoda
- Superfamily: Seguenzioidea
- Family: Calliotropidae
- Genus: Calliotropis
- Species: C. equatorialis

Binomial name
- Calliotropis equatorialis (Dall, 1896)

Synonyms
- Bathybembix equatorialis (Dall, 1896); Calliotropis (Solaricida) equatorialis (Dall, 1896); Solariella equatorialis Dall, 1896 (original combination)

Species of gastropod

Calliotropis equatorialis is a species of sea snail, a marine gastropod mollusk in the family Eucyclidae.

== Description ==
The shell can grow to be 21 mm.

== Distribution ==
This species occurs in the Pacific Ocean from Southern California to Peru.
