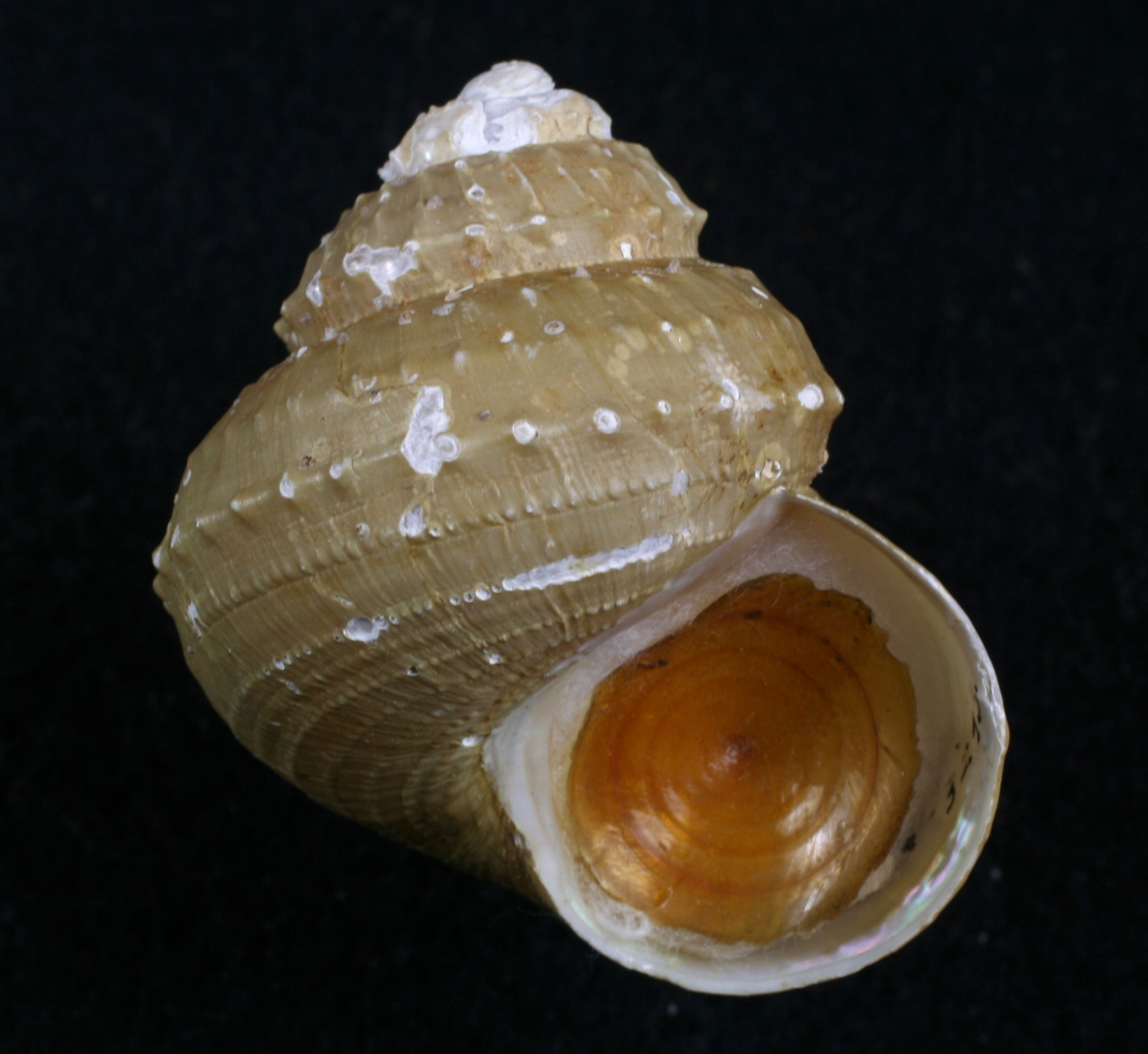
- Apertural view of shell of Bathybembix bairdii (Dall, 1889) with operculum

Scientific classification
- Kingdom: Animalia
- Phylum: Mollusca
- Class: Gastropoda
- Subclass: Vetigastropoda
- Family: Calliotropidae
- Genus: Bathybembix
- Species: B. bairdii

Binomial name
- Bathybembix bairdii Dall, 1889

Synonyms
- Solariella oxybasis Dall, 1890; Turcicula bairdii Dall, 1889 (original combination)

= Bathybembix bairdii =

Species of gastropod

Bathybembix bairdii, common name Baird's top shell, is a species of deep-water sea snail, a marine gastropod mollusc in the family Calliotropidae.

== Description ==
The size of the shell varies between 38 mm and 50 mm.

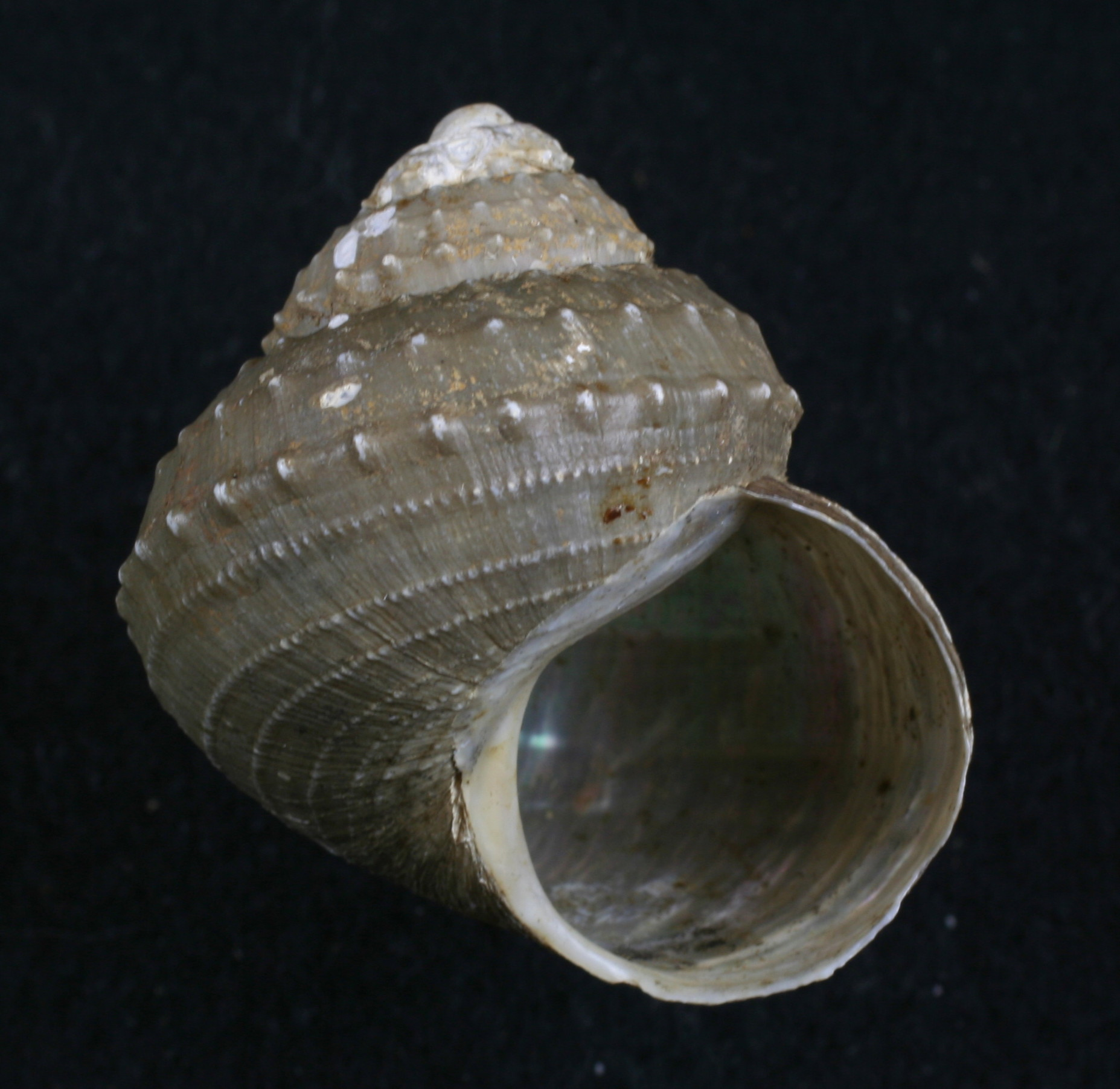
Apertural view of shell of Bathybembix bairdii (Dall, 1889)

== Distribution ==
This species occurs in the Pacific Ocean from the Bering Sea to Chile at depths between 300 m and 1,500 m.
