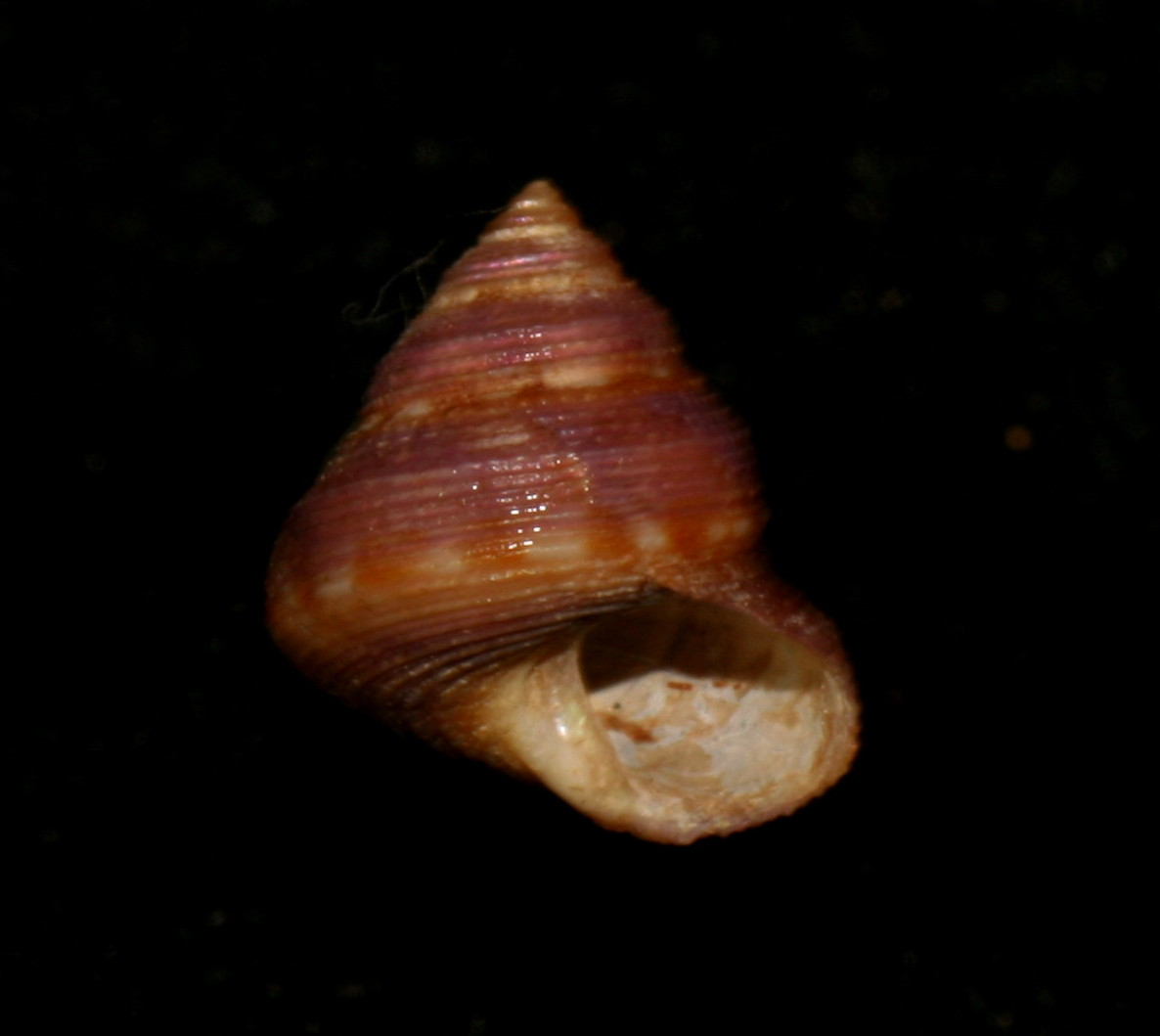
- An unusual color pattern shell of Calliostoma supragranosum Carpenter, 1864 from Laguna Beach, California

Scientific classification
- Kingdom: Animalia
- Phylum: Mollusca
- Class: Gastropoda
- Subclass: Vetigastropoda
- Order: Trochida
- Family: Calliostomatidae
- Subfamily: Calliostomatinae
- Genus: Calliostoma; Swainson, 1840
- Species: C. supragranosum

Binomial name
- Calliostoma supragranosum Carpenter, 1864

Synonyms
- Calliostoma formosum Carpenter, 1864; Calliostoma splendens Carpenter, 1864

= Calliostoma supragranosum =

Species of gastropod

Calliostoma supragranosum Carpenter, 1864 is a species of sea snail, a marine gastropod mollusk in the family Calliostomatidae, which was formerly placed within the Trochidae or top snails. Its common name is the granulated top snail.

== Description ==
This is a small species. The height of the rather thin, conical shell varies between 6 mm and 15 mm. It is imperforate. The shell is composed of 5 convex whorls. The sculpture of the shell is characterized by numerous fine spiral cords that are strongly beaded in the early whorls, and may become weakly beaded on later whorls. The apical whorls is very minute, smooth, and whitish. The next 2 whorls are encircled by 2 strong, articulated ribs. On the next whorl these ribs become beaded, and smaller beaded riblets appear above them. The body whorl has 4 (or 5) strong, elevated ribs around the middle, above them two or three beaded ribs. The base of the shell has 9 fine, distinct smooth concentric lirae. The body whorl is somewhat biangular at periphery, slightly convex beneath. The oblique aperture is nearly round. The peristome is thin, a trifle crenulated inside. The columella has a slight excavation, and is very bluntly nodulous near the base. The interior is brightly nacreous

The shell color is typically a light yellowish-brown with irregular lighter, subsutural maculations, very occasionally with pink or purple beads or rarely a stripe. It has a peripheral circle of alternating chestnut and white spots. The ribs of the base are minutely articulated with chestnut and white.

== Distribution ==
This species occurs from Monterey Bay, California to Asuncion Island southern Baja California, Mexico.
