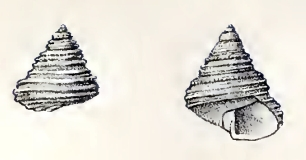
- Drawing with two views of a shell of Calliostoma occidentale

Scientific classification
- Kingdom: Animalia
- Phylum: Mollusca
- Class: Gastropoda
- Subclass: Vetigastropoda
- Order: Trochida
- Family: Calliostomatidae
- Genus: Calliostoma
- Species: C. occidentale

Binomial name
- Calliostoma occidentale (Mighels & C. B. Adams, 1842)

Synonyms
- Calliostoma formosum (McAndrew & Forbes, 1847); Margarita alabastrum Lovén, 1846; Margarites alabastrum "Beck, H.H. MS" Lovén, S.L., 1846; Trochus alabastrum (Lovén, 1846); Trochus formosus MacAndrew, R. & E. Forbes, 1842; Trochus occidentalis Mighels & Adams, 1842 (original description); Trochus quadricinctus S. V. Wood, 1848; Zizyphinus alabastrum Beck in Reeve

= Calliostoma occidentale =

Species of gastropod

Calliostoma occidentale, common name the boreal topsnail, is a species of sea snail, a marine gastropod mollusk in the family Calliostomatidae.

== Description ==
The size of the shell varies between 6 mm and 17 mm. The shell is rather small, thin, imperforate, and opalescent with a shining surface. It is strongly sculptured above with smooth, yellowish spiral ribs, narrower than their interstices, numbering 3 or 4 on each of the 7 to 8 whorls. The periphery is very bluntly subangular. The base of the shell is nearly flat, with a few ribs around the axis and at the periphery, otherwise it is smooth. The acute spire is elevated. The apical whorl is minute, smooth, and rounded. Three whorls follow which are beaded on the spiral ribs. The sutures are impressed. The pearly aperture is rather rounded. The narrow columella is arcuate, not dentate or truncate at its base.

== Distribution ==
This species has a wide distribution. It occurs in European waters, the Northwest Atlantic Ocean, Greenland, Scandinavia and in the Barents Sea at depths between 18 m and 1800 m.
