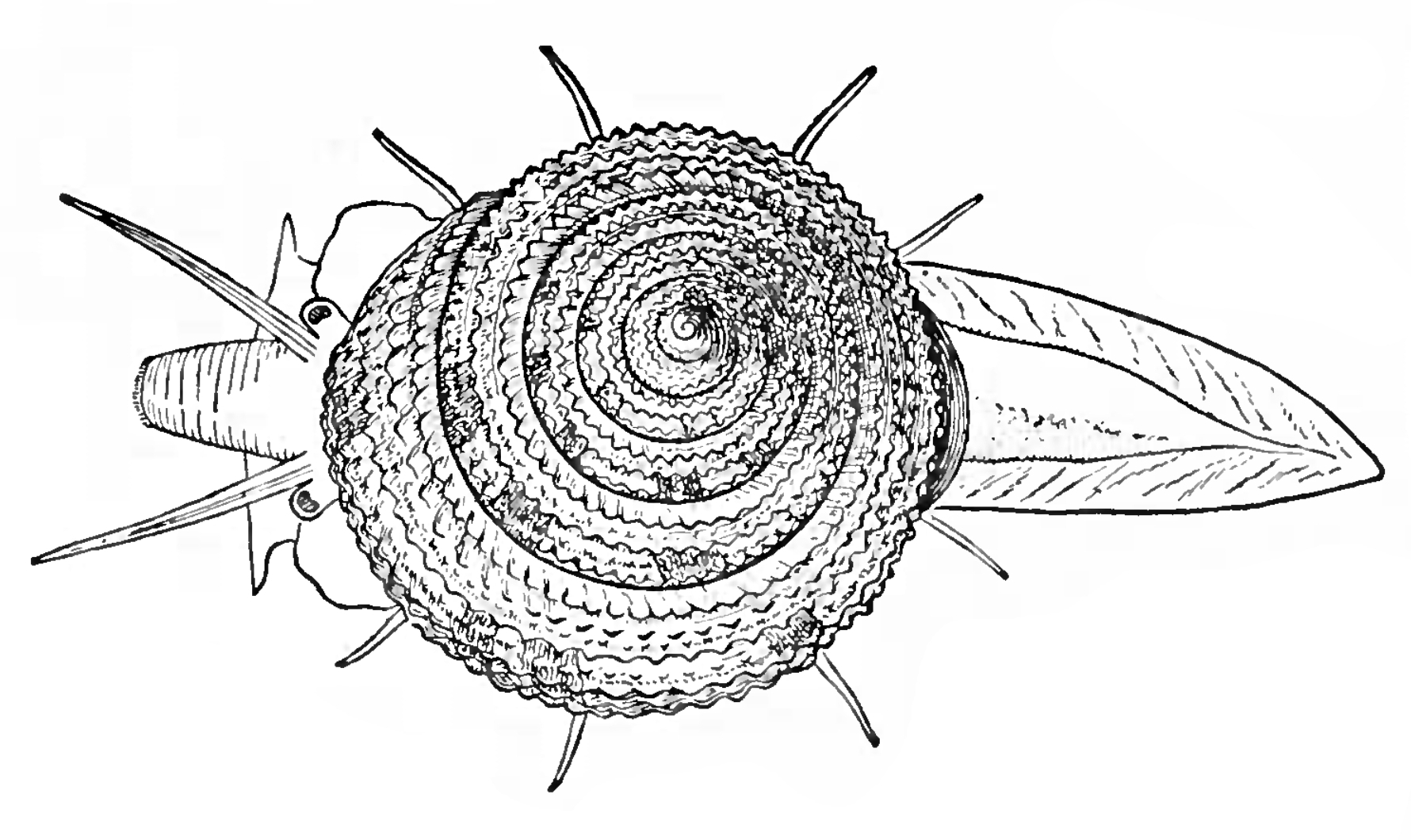
- Drawing of dorsal view of living animal of Calliostoma bairdii.

Scientific classification
- Kingdom: Animalia
- Phylum: Mollusca
- Class: Gastropoda
- Subclass: Vetigastropoda
- Order: Trochida
- Family: Calliostomatidae
- Genus: Calliostoma
- Species: C. bairdii

Binomial name
- Calliostoma bairdii A. E. Verrill & S. Smith, 1880

Synonyms
- Calliostoma (Kombologion) bairdii bairdii Verrill & Smith, 1880

= Calliostoma bairdii =

Species of gastropod

Calliostoma bairdii, common name the Baird's top shell, is a species of sea snail with an operculum, a marine gastropod mollusk in the family Calliostomatidae, the calliostoma top snails.

== Distribution ==
North West Atlantic. Range covers both subprovinces of Acadian and Virginian. Range: 41.67°N to 34.65°N; 75.58°W to 65.77°W. Distribution: USA: Massachusetts, New Jersey, Maryland, Virginia, North Carolina; 41.67°N to 34.65°N; 75.58°W to 65.77°W.

== Description ==
The maximum recorded shell length is 33 mm.

The large, strong shell is regularly conical, with a flattened base, and lacks an umbilicus, It is yellowish white or light yellow, with more or less numerous narrow, spiral bands of pale brown or dark brown, and with large squarish spots of bright rosy red on the spire. The nine or ten whorls are flattened, or concave, below the suture, which is not impressed. The body whorl has eight to ten conspicuous, raised, nodulous revolving ribs, of which three or four are much smaller and alternate with the larger ones. The strongest rib is just below the suture. The interstices are concave, brownish, glossy, and obliquely striated by the lines of growth. Sometimes they show subordinate, revolving, raised lines. The four principal ribs are continued on the upper whorls, but the intermediate ones gradually disappear on the middle whorls. The whitish nodules on the ribs are prominent, rounded and smooth, and extend to near the apex. The nuclear whorl is smooth. The next ones contain three carinae. The base of the shell has about twelve spiral, nodulous ribs with some intermediate, smaller ones. The umbilical region is slightly excavated spirally. The columella is strongly concave, terminating in an indistinct tooth.

The yellowish animal has long tentacles, and four long cirri on each side. The eyes are well developed. The radula is somewhat different from the typical species of the genus; there is no large lateral tooth, between the inner and outer series. The outermost teeth are broad, flat, curved. The operculum is thin, circular, and with many narrow whorls.

== Habitat ==
The minimum recorded depth of this species is 68 m; maximum recorded depth is 1170 m. Dredged at 40–60 metres, 30 miles off Chincoteague, Virginia.
