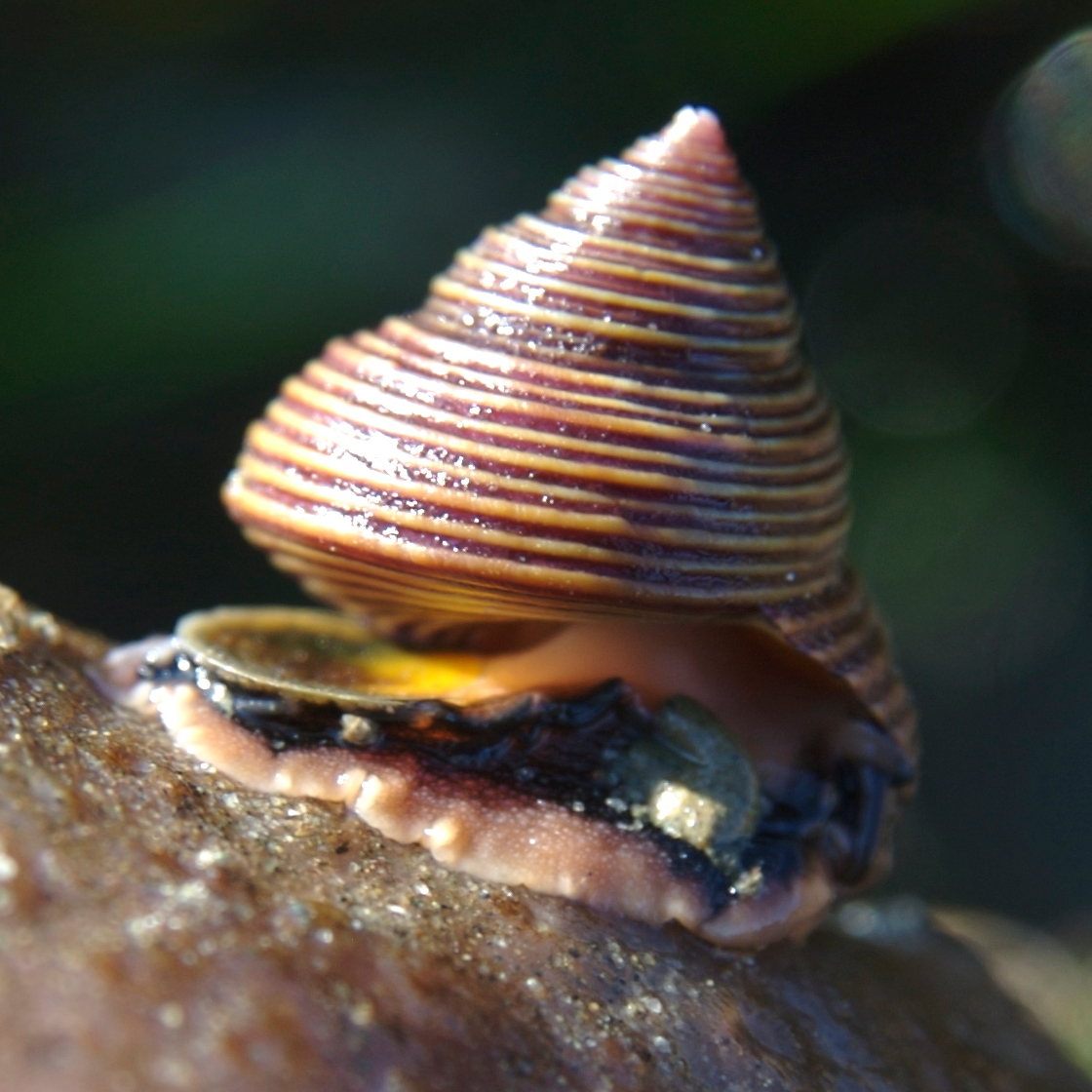
- A live individual of Calliostoma ligatum with the operculum showing at the back (on the left)

Scientific classification
- Kingdom: Animalia
- Phylum: Mollusca
- Class: Gastropoda
- Subclass: Vetigastropoda
- Order: Trochida
- Superfamily: Trochoidea
- Family: Calliostomatidae
- Subfamily: Calliostomatinae
- Genus: Calliostoma; Swainson, 1840

Type species
- Trochus conulus Linnaeus, 1758

Synonyms
- List: Ampullotrochus Monterosato, 1890; Calliostoma (Ampullotrochus) Monterosato, 1890; Calliostoma (Calliostoma) Swainson, 1840; Calliostoma (Elmerlinia) Clench & R. D. Turner, 1960; Calliostoma (Eucasta) Dall, 1889; Calliostoma (Kombologion) Clench & R. D. Turner, 1960; Calliostoma (Leiotrochus) Conrad, 1862; Callistoma Herrmannsen, 1846; Callistomus Herrmannsen, 1846; Conulus Nardo, 1841; Elmerlinia Clench & Turner, 1960; Eucasta Dall, 1889; Fluxina Dall, 1889; Jacinthius Monterosato, 1889; Kombologion Clench & Turner, 1960; Leiotrochus Conrad, 1862; Trochus (Calliostoma) Swainson, 1840; Trochus (Ziziphinus) Gray, 1842; Trochus (Zizyphinus) Gray, 1847; Ziziphinus Gray, 1842; Zizyphinus [sic]

= Calliostoma =

Genus of sea snails

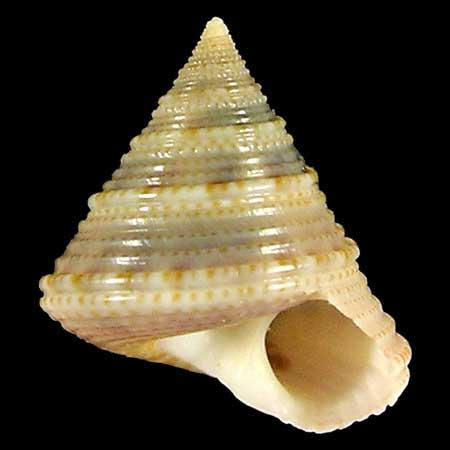
Apertural view of a shell of Calliostoma trotini

Calliostoma is a genus of small to medium-sized sea snails with gills and an operculum, marine gastropod molluscs within the family Calliostomatidae, the Calliostoma top snails. Previously this genus was placed within the family Trochidae. Calliostoma is the type genus of the family Calliostomatidae.

== Description ==
The name of this genus is derived from the Greek words kallos (beautiful) and stoma (mouth), referring to the pearly aperture of the shell. The genus Calliostoma is known in fossil records from the Upper Cretaceous onwards.

The thin, acute, coeloconoid (approaching conical shape but with concave sides) shell is imperforate or rarely umbilicate. The whorls are smooth, often polished and spirally ridged or granular. The body whorl is angulated at the periphery. The aperture is quadrangular, sinuated at the base and slightly oblique. The columella is simple, usually ending anteriorly in a slight tooth. The nucleus appears to be either dextral or sinistral indifferently.

== Species ==
As of 2022, Calliostoma is treated as a very broad genus of about 300 accepted species. While current information is too fragmentary to assign all species in a revised genus, it is expected to be broken up and (some) subgenera will be elevated to the status of genus.

== Distribution and habitat ==
The distribution of this genus is worldwide, found mainly on hard substrates, although Japanese species have been found on sandy bottoms. These snails occur from shallow waters to bathyal depths.

== Behaviour and ecology ==
The species in this genus are mainly herbivorous or feed on detritus, although a few have been observed to be omnivorous (Keen, 1975) or even carnivorous, feeding on a wide range of algae and on animals belonging to various other invertebrate phyla. The North Atlantic topshell Calliostoma occidentale has been reported to feed on coelenterates.

Contrary to what is the case in most other top shells, species of the genus Calliostoma deposits their eggs in gelatinous ribbons that are only fertilized after being deposited. The young emerge as small snails (Lebour, 1936) without passing through a free-living planktonic stage as a veliger larva.

== Gallery ==
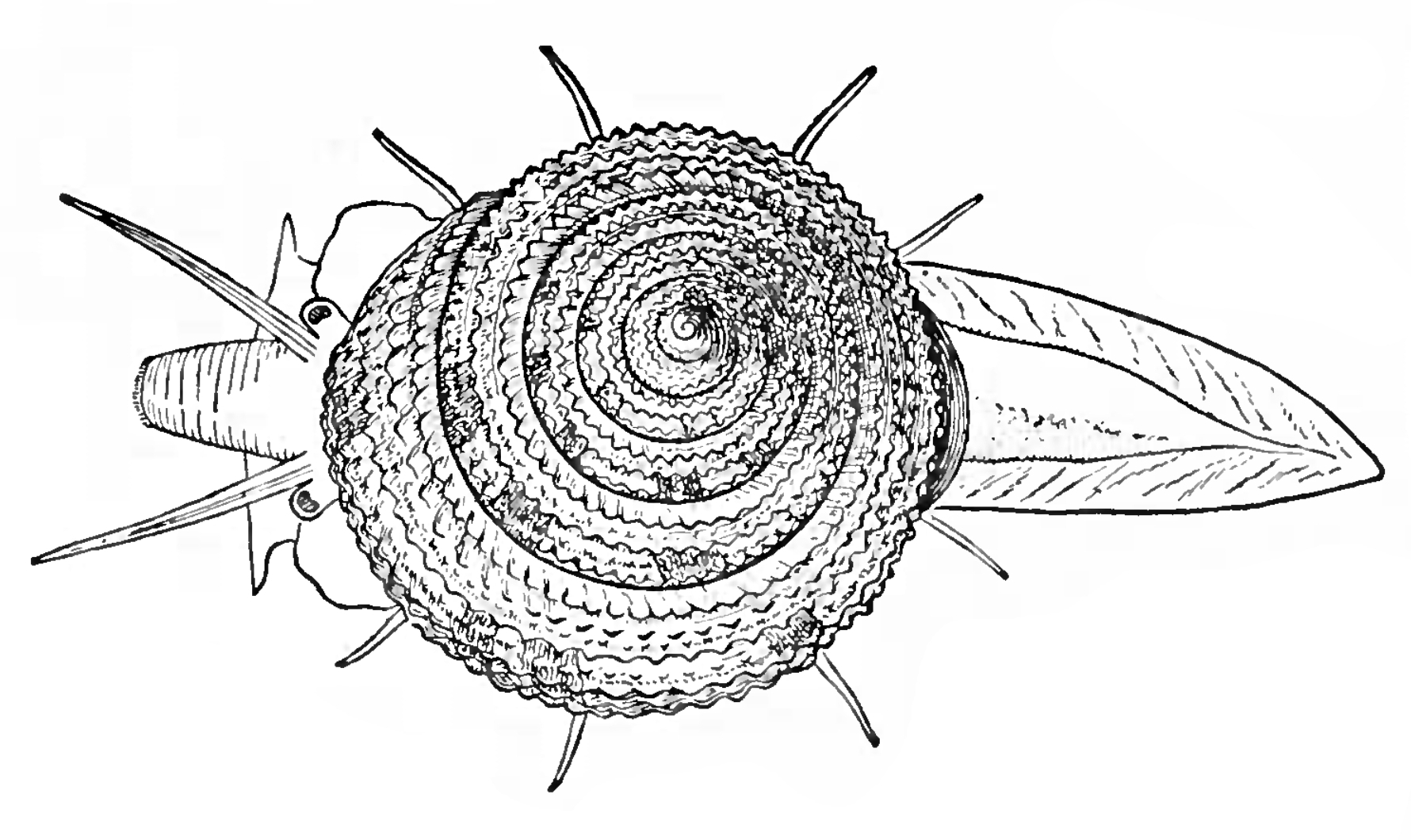
Drawing of a dorsal view of a living animal of Calliostoma bairdii dredged in the Atlantic Ocean at a depth of from 100m to 1170m.

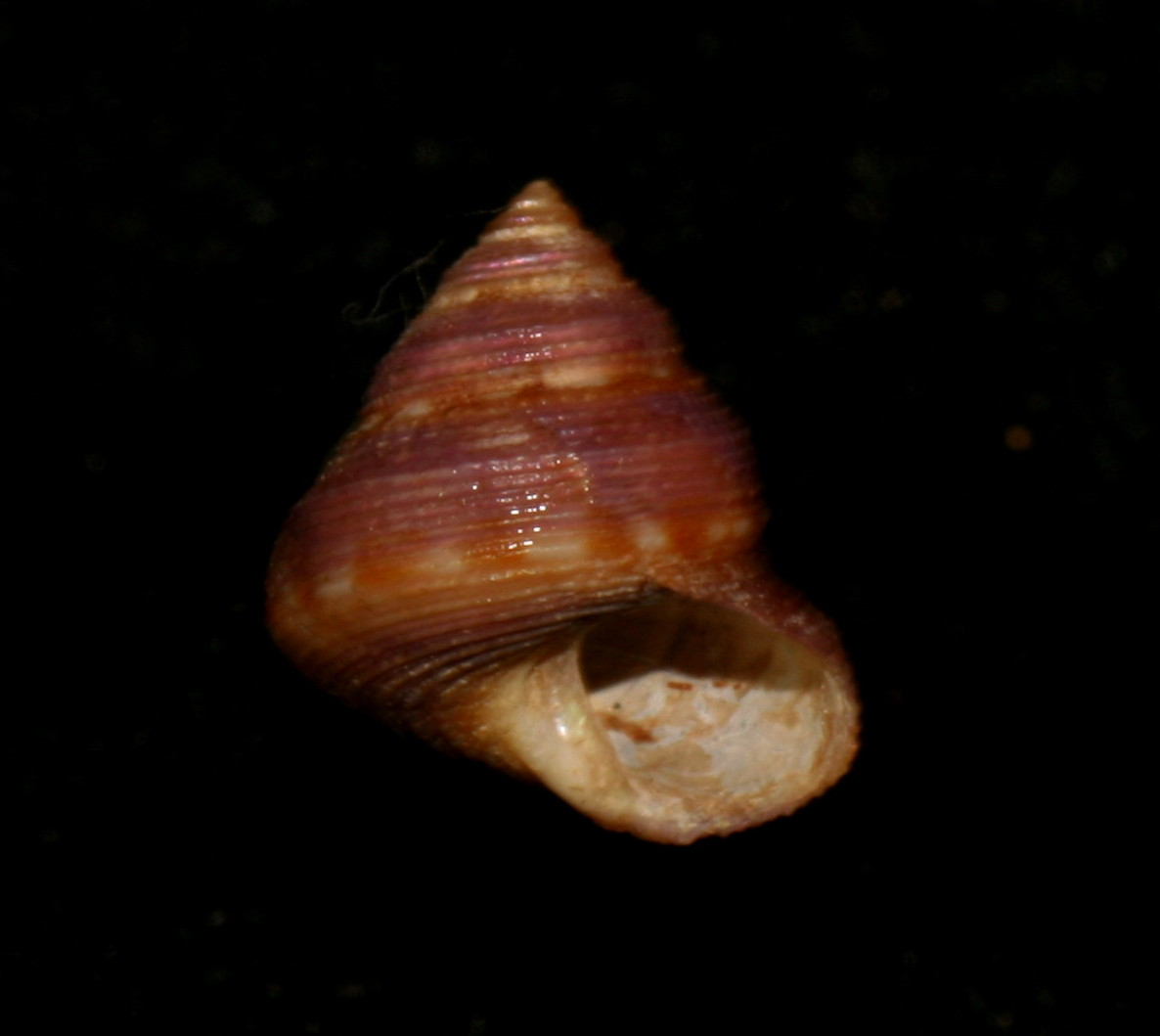
Rare purple beaded specimen of Calliostoma supragranosum found subtidally in Southern California.

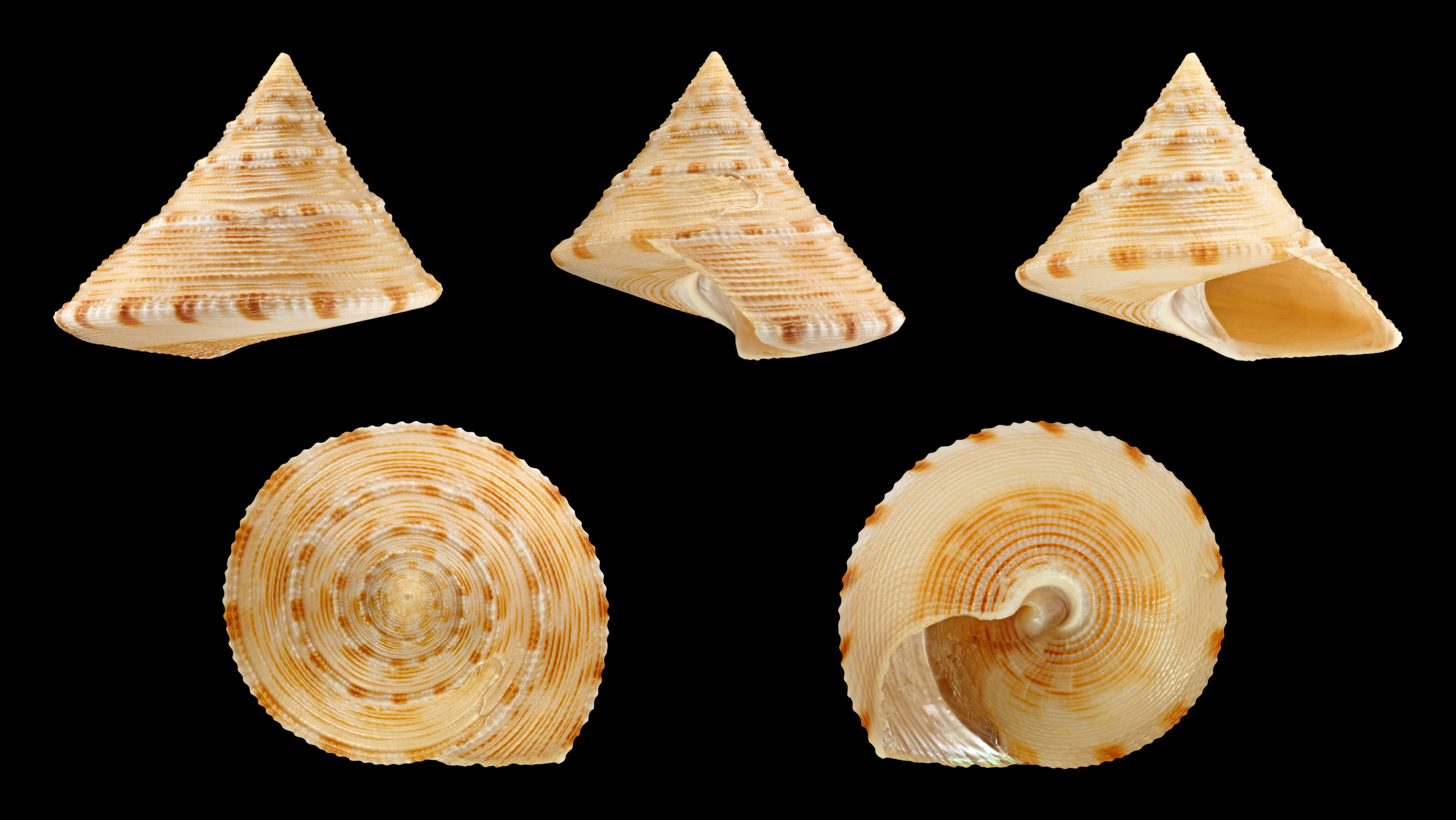
These shells are from the species Calliostoma formosense, originating from the island of Taiwan.
