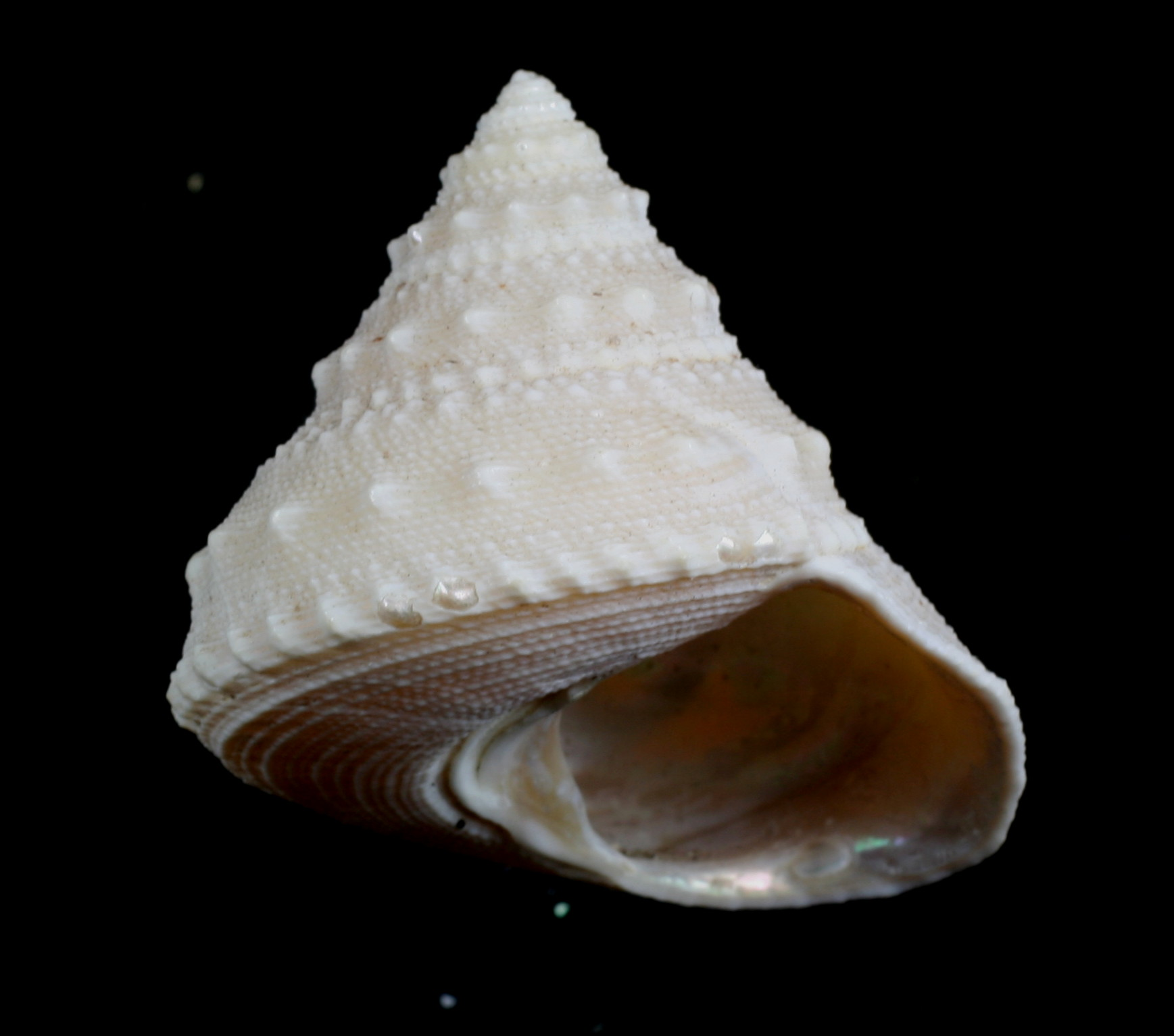
- Apertural view of shell of Lischkeia alwinae (Lischke, 1871)

Scientific classification
- Kingdom: Animalia
- Phylum: Mollusca
- Class: Gastropoda
- Subclass: Vetigastropoda
- Family: Eucyclidae
- Genus: Lischkeia; Fischer, 1879

Type species
- Lischkeia alwinae Lischke, C.E., 1871

Synonyms
- Calliostoma (Lischkeia) P. Fischer, 1879; Margarita (Turcicula) Dall, 1881; Turcicula Dall, 1881

= Lischkeia =

Genus of gastropods

Lischkeia is a genus of sea snails, marine gastropod molluscs in the family Eucyclidae.

== Species ==
Species within the genus Lischkeia include:

- Lischkeia alicei (Dautzenberg & Fischer, 1896)
- Lischkeia alwinae (Lischke, 1871)
- Lischkeia imperialis (Dall, 1881)
- Lischkeia mahajangaensis Vilvens, 2002
- Lischkeia miranda (Locard, 1897)
- Lischkeia reginamaris Habe & Okutani, 1981
- Lischkeia undosa Kuroda & Kawamura, 1956

Species brought into synonymy

- Lischkeia argenteonitens (Lischke, 1872): synonym of Ginebis argenteonitens (Lischke, 1872)
- Lischkeia cidaris (Carpenter, 1864): synonym of Cidarina cidaris (Carpenter, 1864)
- Lischkeia convexiuscula (Yokoyama, 1920): synonym of Ginebis argenteonitens (Lischke, 1872)
- Lischkeia crumpii (Pilsbry, 1893): synonym of Ginebis crumpii (Pilsbry, 1893)
- Lischkeia deichmannae F. M. Bayer, 1971: synonym of Lischkeia imperialis (Dall, 1881)
- Lischkeia ottoi (Philippi, 1844): synonym of Calliotropis ottoi (Philippi, 1844)
- Lischkeia regalis (Verrill & Smith, 1880): synonym of Calliotropis regalis (Verrill & Smith, 1880)
