= Ginebis hamadai =

Scientific classification
- Kingdom: Animalia
- Phylum: Mollusca
- Class: Gastropoda
- Subclass: Vetigastropoda
- Superfamily: Seguenzioidea
- Family: Calliotropidae
- Genus: Ginebis
- Species: G. hamadai

Binomial name
- Ginebis hamadai Kosuge, 1980

Species of gastropod

Ginebis hamadai is a species of sea snail, a marine gastropod mollusk in the family Eucyclidae.
