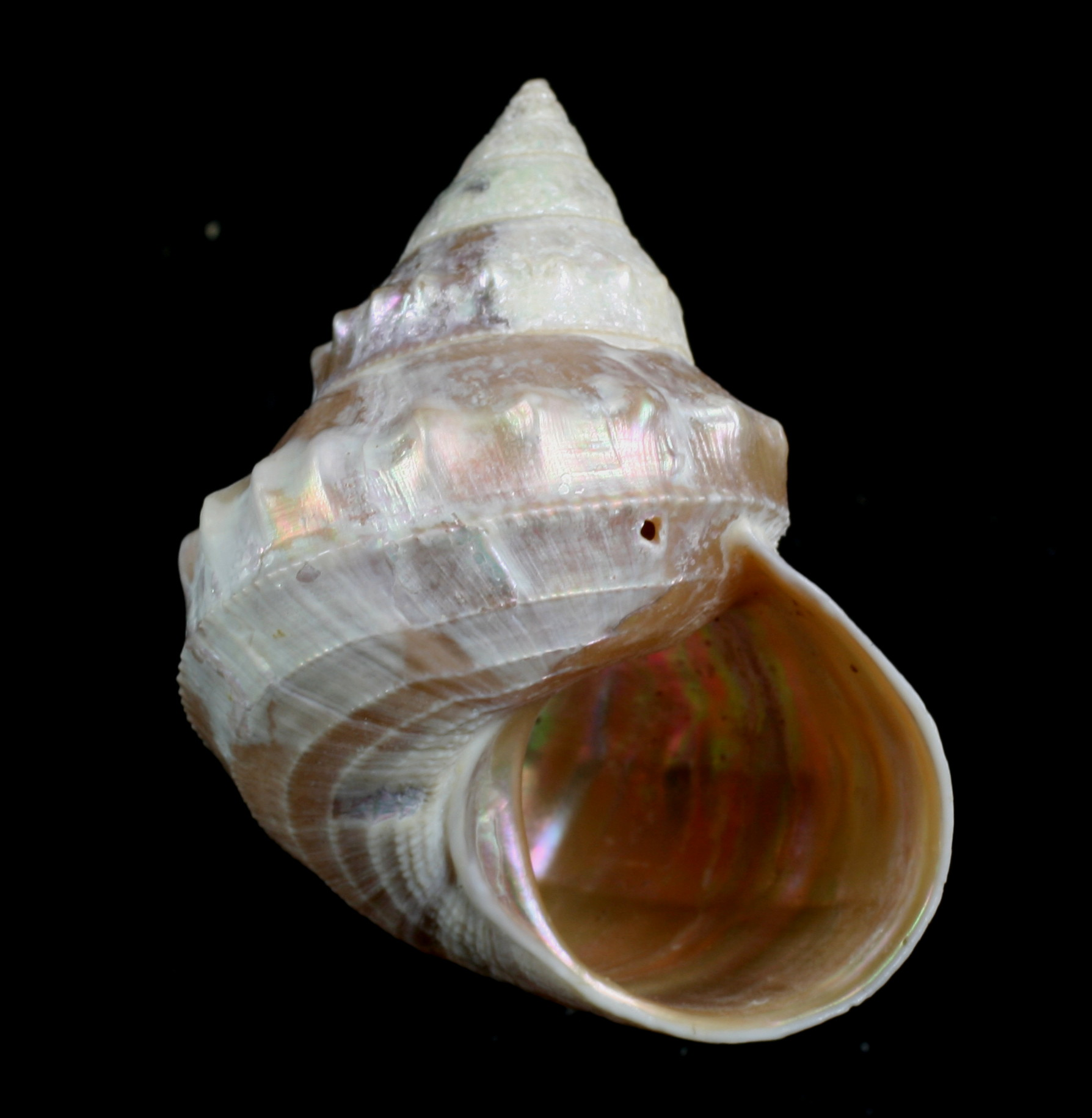
- Apertural view of a shell of Ginebis argenteonitens (Lischke, 1872)

Scientific classification
- Kingdom: Animalia
- Phylum: Mollusca
- Class: Gastropoda
- Subclass: Vetigastropoda
- Family: Calliotropidae
- Genus: Ginebis; Taki & Otuka, 1943

Synonyms
- Convexia Noda, 1975

= Ginebis =

Genus of gastropods

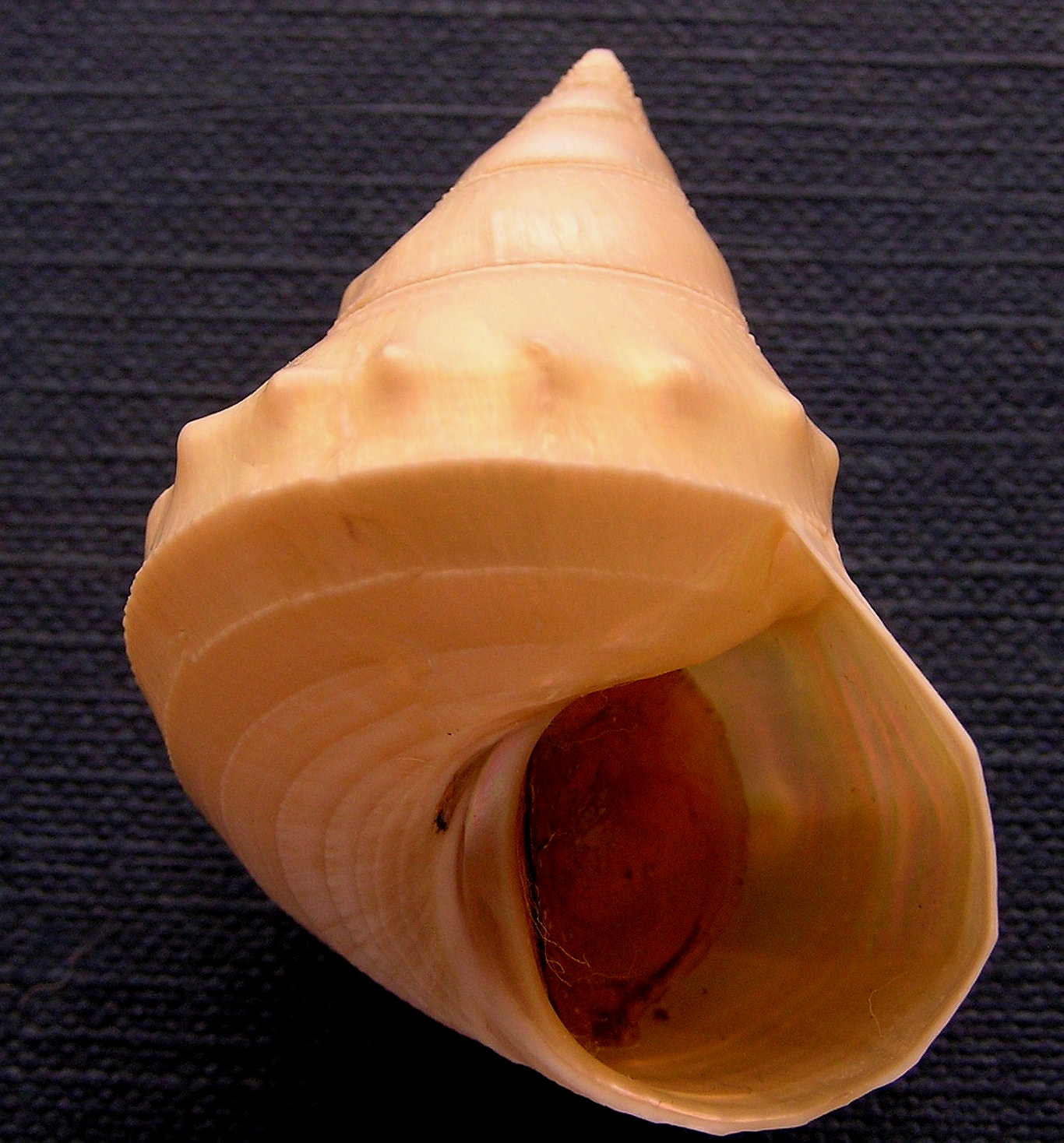
Apertural view of a shell of Ginebis argenteonitens

Ginebis is a genus of sea snails, marine gastropod molluscs in the family Calliotropidae.

== Species ==
Species within the genus Ginebis include:

- Ginebis argenteonitens (Lischke, 1872)
- Ginebis corolla Habe & Kosuge, 1970
- Ginebis crumpii (Pilsbry, 1893)
- Ginebis hamadai Kosuge, 1980
- Ginebis japonica (Dall, 1925)

Species brought into synonymy

- Ginebis convexiuscula (Yokoyama, 1920): synonym of Ginebis argenteonitens (Lischke, 1872)
- Ginebis kirai Sakurai, 1983: synonym of Ginebis argenteonitens (Lischke, 1872)
- Ginebis nakamigawai Sakurai, 1983: synonym of Ginebis argenteonitens (Lischke, 1872)
