= Lischkeia undosa =

Scientific classification
- Kingdom: Animalia
- Phylum: Mollusca
- Class: Gastropoda
- Subclass: Vetigastropoda
- Superfamily: Seguenzioidea
- Family: Eucyclidae
- Genus: Lischkeia
- Species: L. undosa

Binomial name
- Lischkeia undosa Kuroda & Kawamura, 1956

Species of gastropod

Lischkeia undosa is a species of sea snail, a marine gastropod mollusk in the family Eucyclidae.

== Description ==
The size of the trochiform shell varies between 30 mm and 60 mm. It is usually white and covered with a dull white gloss-less periostracum.

== Distribution ==
This marine species occurs off the Philippines.
