= Lischkeia reginamaris =

Scientific classification
- Kingdom: Animalia
- Phylum: Mollusca
- Class: Gastropoda
- Subclass: Vetigastropoda
- Superfamily: Seguenzioidea
- Family: Eucyclidae
- Genus: Lischkeia
- Species: L. reginamaris

Binomial name
- Lischkeia reginamaris Habe & Okutani, 1981

Species of gastropod

Lischkeia reginamaris is a species of sea snail, a marine gastropod mollusk in the family Eucyclidae.

== Distribution ==
This marine species occurs off the Philippines.
