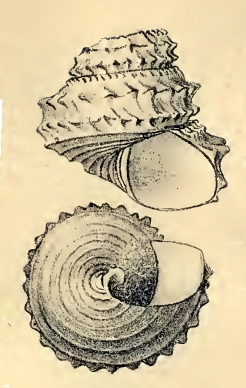
- Drawing with two views of a shell of Lischkeia imperialis

Scientific classification
- Kingdom: Animalia
- Phylum: Mollusca
- Class: Gastropoda
- Subclass: Vetigastropoda
- Family: Eucyclidae
- Genus: Lischkeia
- Species: L. imperialis

Binomial name
- Lischkeia imperialis (Dall, 1881)

Synonyms
- Margarita imperialis Dall, 1881 (basionym); Turcicula imperialis (Dall, 1881)

= Lischkeia imperialis =

Species of gastropod

Lischkeia imperialis, common name : the giant imperial margarite, is a species of sea snail, a marine gastropod mollusk in the family Eucyclidae.

== Description ==
The shell grows to a length of 60 mm. The extremely thin, white shell has globosely a conical shape with five (?) whorls. The umbilicus is reduced to a mere chink under the thin callus of the upper part of the columellar lip. The aperture is rounded rectangular. The columella is somewhat concave. The margins are all thin. The base of the shell is flattened convex, with seven revolving ribs, the outermost of which is just within the periphery. They are crossed by radiating lines of growth, regular and very fine, but raised into low, very sharp lamellae which pass over the periphery onto the upper surface of the whorl. The body whorl is provided with two strong revolving ribs, one of which forms the periphery, while the other lies a little less than half wav from the first toward the oblique, round suture. The outer lip is sharp but strong. It is porcelaneous on the edge, brilliantly nacreous within. It descends very slightly. The white, columellar lip is thick and bent nearly to the point of the columella over the umbilicus. It would be reverted but for the great thickness of the spiral pad, which comes twining up behind it out of the umbilicus, and out of which, at the point of the columella, it forms a flat, triangular, tooth-like expansion. The umbilicus consists of a minute spiral hole, which twists in between the overlying columellar lip and the umbilical pad. The edge is corrugated with the old lines of the lip.

== Distribution ==
This species is distributed in the Gulf of Mexico, the Caribbean Sea and the Lesser Antilles. Offshore West coast Barbados, this species has come to light via freshly-dead 'crabbed' examples found in traps set around 600 ft depth.
