= Ginebis japonica =

Scientific classification
- Kingdom: Animalia
- Phylum: Mollusca
- Class: Gastropoda
- Subclass: Vetigastropoda
- Superfamily: Seguenzioidea
- Family: Calliotropidae
- Genus: Ginebis
- Species: G. japonica

Binomial name
- Ginebis japonica (Dall, 1925)

Synonyms
- Turcicula japonica Dall, 1925

Species of gastropod

Ginebis japonica is a species of sea snail, a marine gastropod mollusk in the family Eucyclidae.

== Description ==
The shell grows to a height of 35 mm.

== Distribution ==
This marine species occurs off Japan.
