= Ginebis corolla =

Scientific classification
- Kingdom: Animalia
- Phylum: Mollusca
- Class: Gastropoda
- Subclass: Vetigastropoda
- Superfamily: Seguenzioidea
- Family: Calliotropidae
- Genus: Ginebis
- Species: G. corolla

Binomial name
- Ginebis corolla Habe & Kosuge, 1970

Species of gastropod

Ginebis corolla is a species of sea snail, a marine gastropod mollusk in the family Eucyclidae.

== Description ==
The height of the shell attains 50 mm.

== Distribution ==
This species occurs in the South China Sea at a depth of 200 m.
