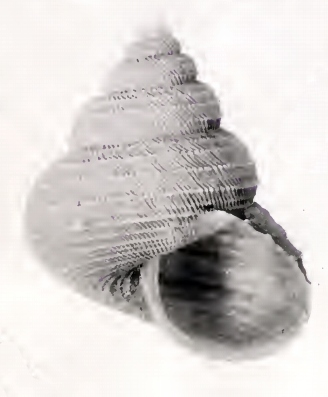
- Original drawing with an apertural view of a shell of Lischkeia alicei

Scientific classification
- Kingdom: Animalia
- Phylum: Mollusca
- Class: Gastropoda
- Subclass: Vetigastropoda
- Family: Eucyclidae
- Genus: Lischkeia
- Species: L. alicei

Binomial name
- Lischkeia alicei (Dautzenberg & H. Fischer, 1896)

Synonyms
- Turcicula alicei Dautzenberg & H. Fischer, 1896 (original combination)

= Lischkeia alicei =

Species of gastropod

Lischkeia alicei is a species of sea snail, a marine gastropod mollusk in the family Eucyclidae.

== Description ==
The shell grows to a height of 25 mm with a coil like structure.

== Distribution ==
This species occurs in the Atlantic Ocean off the Azores at depths between 4,000 m and 4,200 m.
