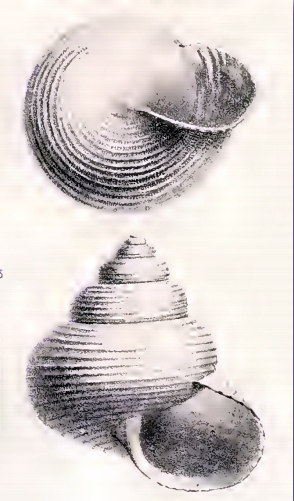
- Original drawing with two views of a shell of Lischkeia miranda

Scientific classification
- Kingdom: Animalia
- Phylum: Mollusca
- Class: Gastropoda
- Subclass: Vetigastropoda
- Family: Eucyclidae
- Genus: Lischkeia
- Species: L. miranda

Binomial name
- Lischkeia miranda (Locard, 1898)

Synonyms
- Turcicula miranda Locard, 1897

= Lischkeia miranda =

Species of gastropod

Lischkeia miranda is a species of sea snail, a marine gastropod mollusk in the family Eucyclidae.

== Distribution ==
This species occurs in European waters.
