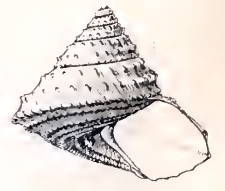
- Original drawing with an apertural view of a shell of Calliotropis regalis

Scientific classification
- Kingdom: Animalia
- Phylum: Mollusca
- Class: Gastropoda
- Subclass: Vetigastropoda
- Family: Calliotropidae
- Genus: Calliotropis
- Species: C. regalis

Binomial name
- Calliotropis regalis (Verrill & Smith, 1880)

Synonyms
- Calliostoma regalis Verrill & S. Smith, 1880; Lischkeia regalis (Verrill & Smith, 1880); Margarita regalis Verrill & S. Smith, 1880 (basionym); Solariella regalis (Verrill & S. Smith, 1880)

= Calliotropis regalis =

Species of gastropod

Calliotropis regalis, or the regal spiny margarite, is a species of sea snail, a marine gastropod mollusk in the family Eucyclidae.

In older literature, this species was always synonymized with Margarita regalis Verril & Smlith, 1880 or with Trochus ottoi Philippi, 1844 or with Solariella ottoi Philippi, 1844, all synonyms of Calliotropis ottoi (Philippi, 1844).

== Description ==
The size of an adult shell varies between 6 mm and 18 mm.

== Distribution ==
This species is distributed in European waters along the British Isles and the Faroes, in the Mediterranean Sea, in the Northwest Atlantic Ocean from Nova Scotia to North Carolina.
