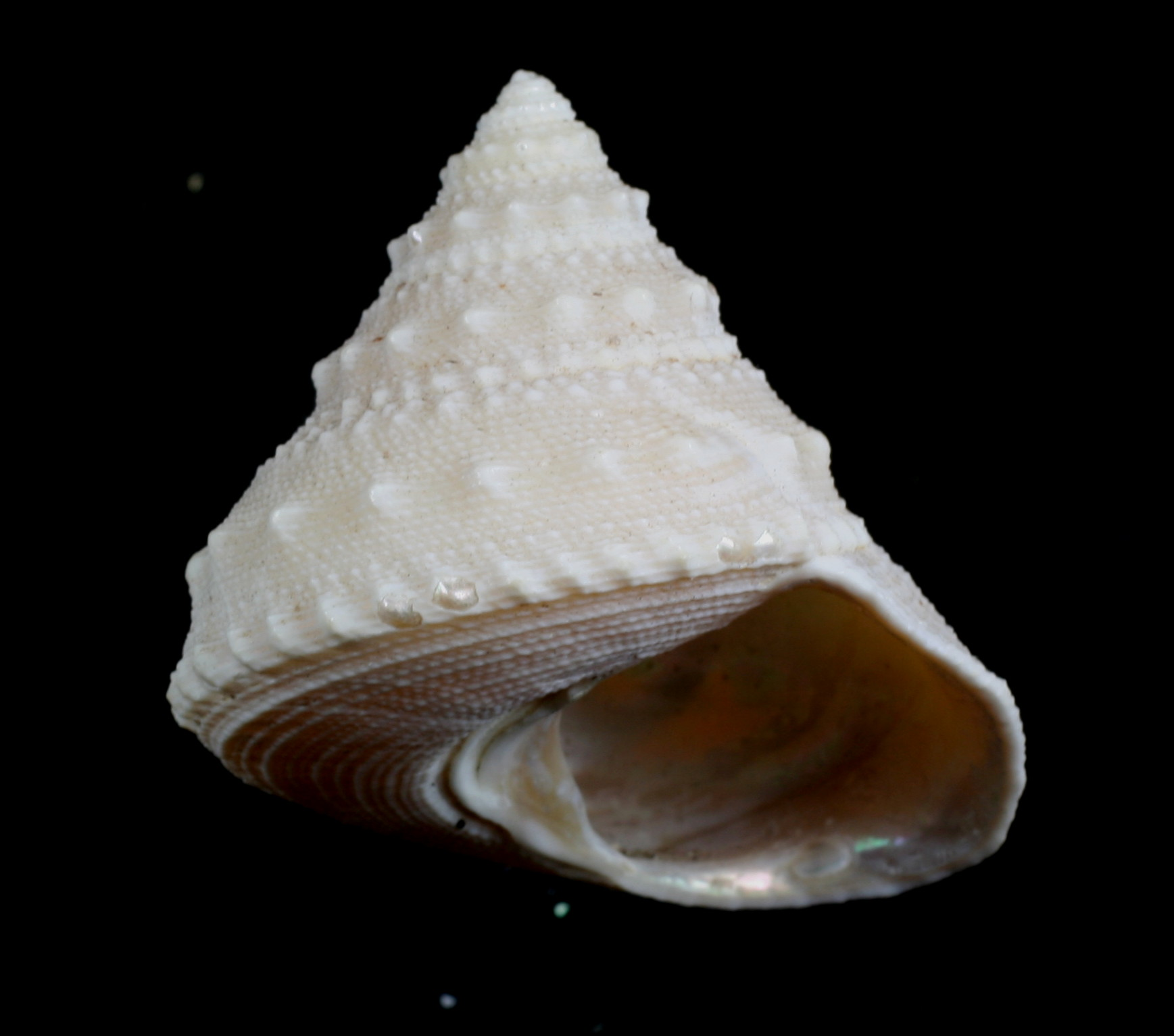
- Apertural view of shell of Lischkeia alwinae (Lischke, 1871)

Scientific classification
- Kingdom: Animalia
- Phylum: Mollusca
- Class: Gastropoda
- Subclass: Vetigastropoda
- Family: Eucyclidae
- Genus: Lischkeia
- Species: L. alwinae

Binomial name
- Lischkeia alwinae (Lischke, 1871)

Synonyms
- Margarita (Bathybembix) alwinae Lischke, 1871

= Lischkeia alwinae =

Species of gastropod

Lischkeia alwinae is a species of deep-water sea snail, a marine gastropod mollusk in the family Eucyclidae.

== Description ==
The size of the shell varies between 35 mm and 50 mm.

== Distribution ==
This marine species occurs off Japan and in the China Sea.
