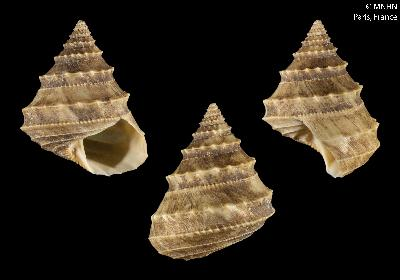

Scientific classification
- Kingdom: Animalia
- Phylum: Mollusca
- Class: Gastropoda
- Subclass: Vetigastropoda
- Family: Eucyclidae
- Genus: Lischkeia
- Species: L. mahajangaensis

Binomial name
- Lischkeia mahajangaensis Vilvens, 2002

Synonyms
- Ginebis mahajangaensis (Vilvens, 2002)

= Lischkeia mahajangaensis =

Species of gastropod

Lischkeia mahajangaensis is a species of sea snail, a marine gastropod mollusk in the family Eucyclidae.

== Description ==
The shell grows to a height of 25 mm.

== Distribution ==
This species occurs in the Indian Ocean off Madagascar.
