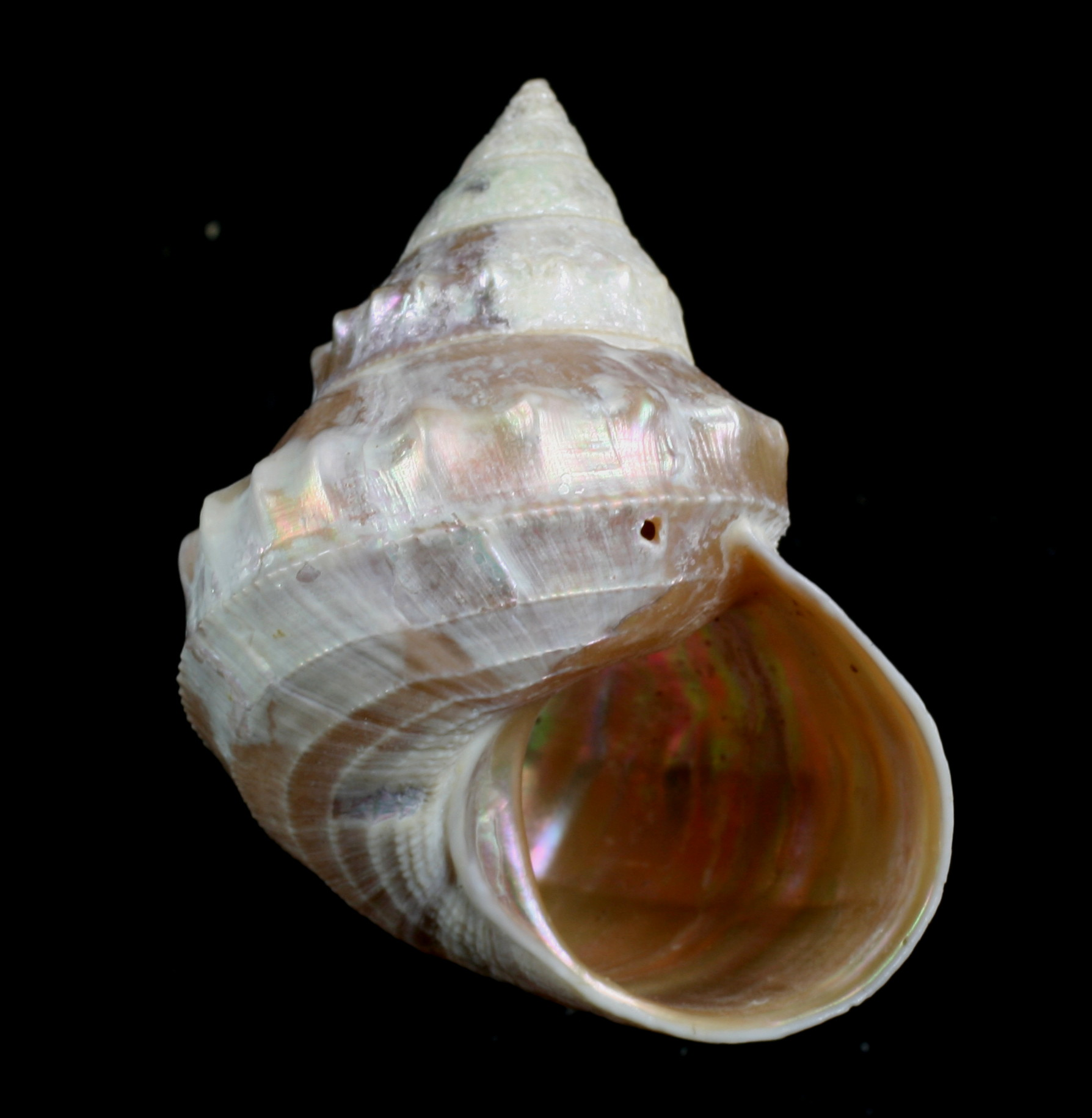
- Apertural view of shell of Ginebis argenteonitens (Lischke, 1872)

Scientific classification
- Kingdom: Animalia
- Phylum: Mollusca
- Class: Gastropoda
- Subclass: Vetigastropoda
- Family: Calliotropidae
- Genus: Ginebis
- Species: G. argenteonitens

Binomial name
- Ginebis argenteonitens (Lischke, 1872)

Synonyms
- Bembix convexiusculum Yokoyama, 1920 †; Calliostoma argenteonitens Lischke, 1872; Ginebis convexiuscula (Yokoyama, 1920); Ginebis kirai Sakurai, 1983; Ginebis nakamigawai Sakurai, 1983; Lischkeia convexiuscula (Yokoyama, 1920); Lischkeia convexiuscula tosana Shikama, 1962; Trochus argenteonitens Lischke, 1872 (original combination); Turcicula argenteonitens (Lischke, 1872); Turcicula argenteonitens hirasei Taki & Otuka, 1943

= Ginebis argenteonitens =

Species of gastropod

Ginebis argenteonitens is a species of deep-water sea snail, a marine gastropod mollusc in the family Calliotropidae.

== Description ==
The size of the shell varies between 37 mm and 60 mm. The thin, imperforate, yellowish shell has a conoidal shape. Its apex is acute. It is beautifully iridescent, the underlying nacre shining through. The eight whorls are a little convex. They are obsoletely sculptured with incremental striae. The suture has a series of fine short folds on each side. Three last whorls are covered with a median series of tubercles. The aperture covers almost half the entire altitude. The body whorl is encircled by an acute compressed carina at the base. The base of the shell is very convex, with 8 narrow crenulated spiral lirae, the first 3 separated, the rest closer. The aperture is rounded-subquadrate. The columella is sinuous, and brilliantly pearly.

== Distribution ==
This marine species occurs off Japan, in the East China Sea, off Taiwan and off the Philippines
