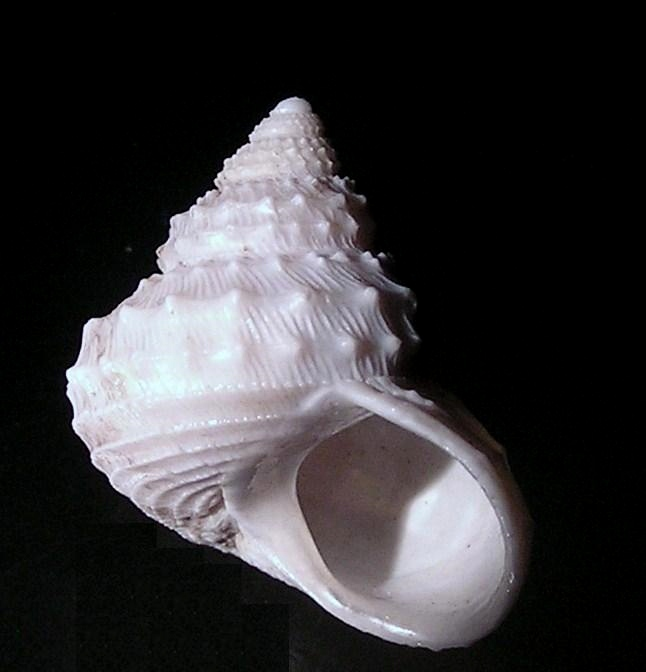
- Lateral view of a shell of Ginebis crumpii

Scientific classification
- Kingdom: Animalia
- Phylum: Mollusca
- Class: Gastropoda
- Subclass: Vetigastropoda
- Superfamily: Seguenzioidea
- Family: Calliotropidae
- Genus: Ginebis
- Species: G. crumpii

Binomial name
- Ginebis crumpii (Pilsbry, 1893)

Synonyms
- Lischkeia crumpii (Pilsbry, 1893)

= Ginebis crumpii =

Species of gastropod

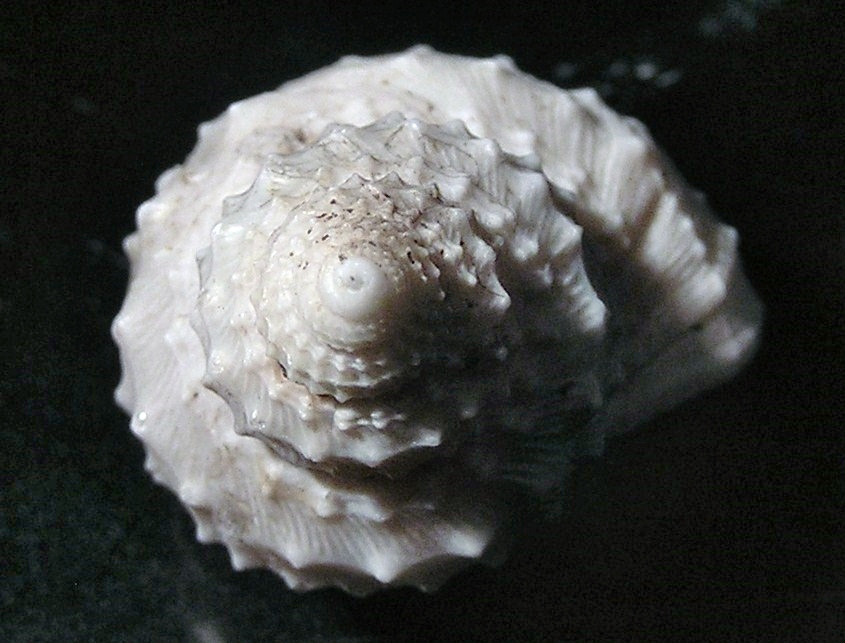
Dorsal view of a shell of Ginebis crumpii

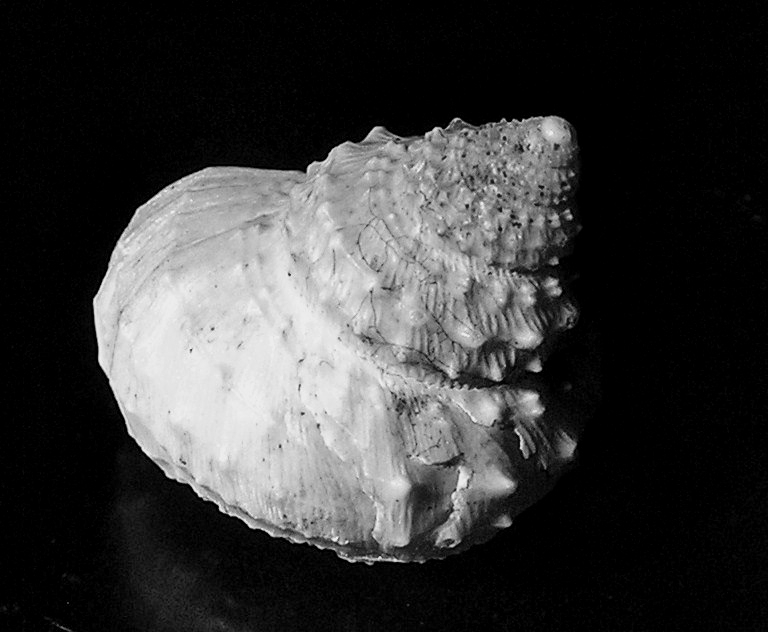
Basal view of a shell of Ginebis crumpii

Ginebis crumpii, common name Crump's margarite, is a species of sea snail, a marine gastropod mollusk in the family Eucyclidae.

== Description ==
The size of the shell varies between 20 mm and 45 mm.

== Distribution ==
This marine species occurs off Taiwan, Southern Japan, and in the East China Sea.
