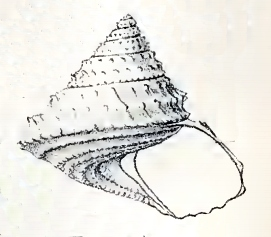
- Drawing with an apertural view of a shell of Calliotropis ottoi

Scientific classification
- Kingdom: Animalia
- Phylum: Mollusca
- Class: Gastropoda
- Subclass: Vetigastropoda
- Family: Calliotropidae
- Genus: Calliotropis
- Species: C. ottoi

Binomial name
- Calliotropis ottoi (Philippi, 1844)

Synonyms
- Calliotropis (Calliotropis) ottoi (Philippi, R.A., 1844); Lischkeia ottoi (Philippi, 1844); Solariella infundibulum Odhner, N.H.J., 1912; Solariella ottoi Philippi, 1844; Trochus ottoi Philippi, 1844

= Calliotropis ottoi =

Species of gastropod

Calliotropis ottoi, common name Otto's spiny margarite, is a species of sea snail, a marine gastropod mollusc in the family Eucyclidae.

== Description ==
The size of the shell varies between 6 mm and 18 mm (1/4 to 3/4-inch). The thin and delicate shell is rather large for the genus; it is whitish, brilliantly iridescent or pearly, externally and internally. It has a broad, conical shape. It is turreted, wider than it is high, with a convex base, and deep umbilicus. The seven whorls are much flattened, with the suture scarcely impressed. The upper whorls are coronated by two, and the body whorl by three, revolving, strongly nodulous ribs, along which the conical, often acute nodules are very regularly arranged. The first of these rows of nodules is just below the suture. The second is separated from the first by a wide, flat, or slightly concave interspace. The third is not far from the second, and surrounds the periphery, usually corresponding with the line of the suture. The second and third are usually the most elevated. On the base of the shell there are five or six strong, rounded, revolving ribs, part of them usually somewhat nodulous, separated by deep, concave interspaces, rather wider than he rib; one or two additional ones often appear in the umbilical opening, which is funnel-shaped and moderately large, but often partially obstructed by the reflected (turned outwards) edge of the inner lip. The interspaces between all the ribs are covered with close, slightly raised lines of growth, and usually with traces of a thin epidermis. The large aperture is somewhat quadrangular. The lip is thin.

The animal has long tentacles and large black eyes. There are four large lateral cirri on each side, with a group of four or five small intermediate ones. The snout has a broad, bilobed, crescent-shaped expansion in front. The odontophore has no large lateral tooth between the inner and outer series.

== Distribution ==
This species occurs in European waters and in the Northwest Atlantic Ocean.
