= Calliostoma rosewateri =

Scientific classification
- Kingdom: Animalia
- Phylum: Mollusca
- Class: Gastropoda
- Subclass: Vetigastropoda
- Order: Trochida
- Family: Calliostomatidae
- Subfamily: Calliostomatinae
- Genus: Calliostoma
- Species: C. rosewateri

Binomial name
- Calliostoma rosewateri Clench & Turner, 1960

Synonyms
- Calliostoma (Kombologion) rosewateri Clench & Turner, 1960; Calliostoma (Kombologian) bairdii rosewateri Clench & Turner, 1960

Species of gastropod

Calliostoma rosewateri, common name Rosewater's top shell, is a species of sea snail, a marine gastropod mollusk in the family Calliostomatidae.

== Description ==
The shell is spiral shaped and has a radiant metallic gold sheen with fine beads. The size of the shell varies between 20 mm and 30 mm.

== Distribution ==
This species occurs off the Lesser Antilles and in the Caribbean Sea off Colombia at depths between 270 m and 420 m.
