= Calliostoma jeanneae =

Scientific classification
- Kingdom: Animalia
- Phylum: Mollusca
- Class: Gastropoda
- Subclass: Vetigastropoda
- Order: Trochida
- Family: Calliostomatidae
- Genus: Calliostoma
- Species: C. jeanneae

Binomial name
- Calliostoma jeanneae Clench & Turner, 1960

Species of gastropod

Calliostoma jeanneae is a species of sea snail, a marine gastropod mollusk in the family Calliostomatidae.

== Description ==
The height of the shell attains 13 mm.

== Distribution ==
This species occurs in the Gulf of Mexico and in the Caribbean Sea off Cuba at a depth of about 250 m.
