= Calliostoma oregon =

Scientific classification
- Kingdom: Animalia
- Phylum: Mollusca
- Class: Gastropoda
- Subclass: Vetigastropoda
- Order: Trochida
- Family: Calliostomatidae
- Genus: Calliostoma
- Species: C. oregon

Binomial name
- Calliostoma oregon Clench & Turner, 1960

Synonyms
- Calliostoma (Kombologion) oregon Clench & Turner, 1960

Species of gastropod

Calliostoma oregon, common name the Oregon Atlantic top shell, is a species of sea snail, a marine gastropod mollusk in the family Calliostomatidae.

== Description ==
The height of the shell attains 21 mm.

== Distribution ==
This species occurs in the Gulf of Mexico at depths between 206 m and 350 m.
