= Calliostoma springeri =

Scientific classification
- Kingdom: Animalia
- Phylum: Mollusca
- Class: Gastropoda
- Subclass: Vetigastropoda
- Order: Trochida
- Family: Calliostomatidae
- Genus: Calliostoma
- Species: C. springeri

Binomial name
- Calliostoma springeri (Clench & Turner, 1960)

Synonyms
- Calliostoma benedicti springeri Clench, W.J. & R.D. Turner, 1960

Species of gastropod

Calliostoma springeri, commonly known as Springer's top shell, is a species of sea snail, a marine gastropod mollusk in the family Calliostomatidae.

== Description ==
The height of the shell attains 39 mm.

== Distribution ==
This species occurs in the Gulf of Mexico at depths between 219 m and 475 m.
