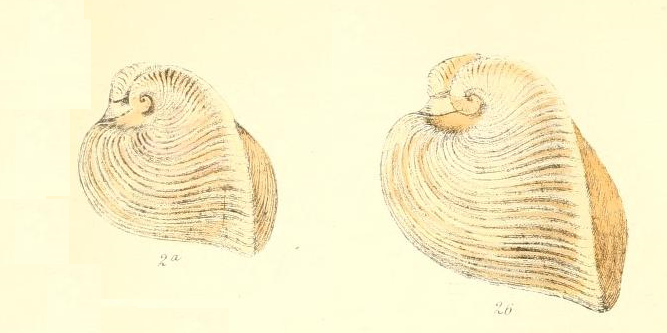
- G. B. Sowerby's illustration accompanying Reeve's description
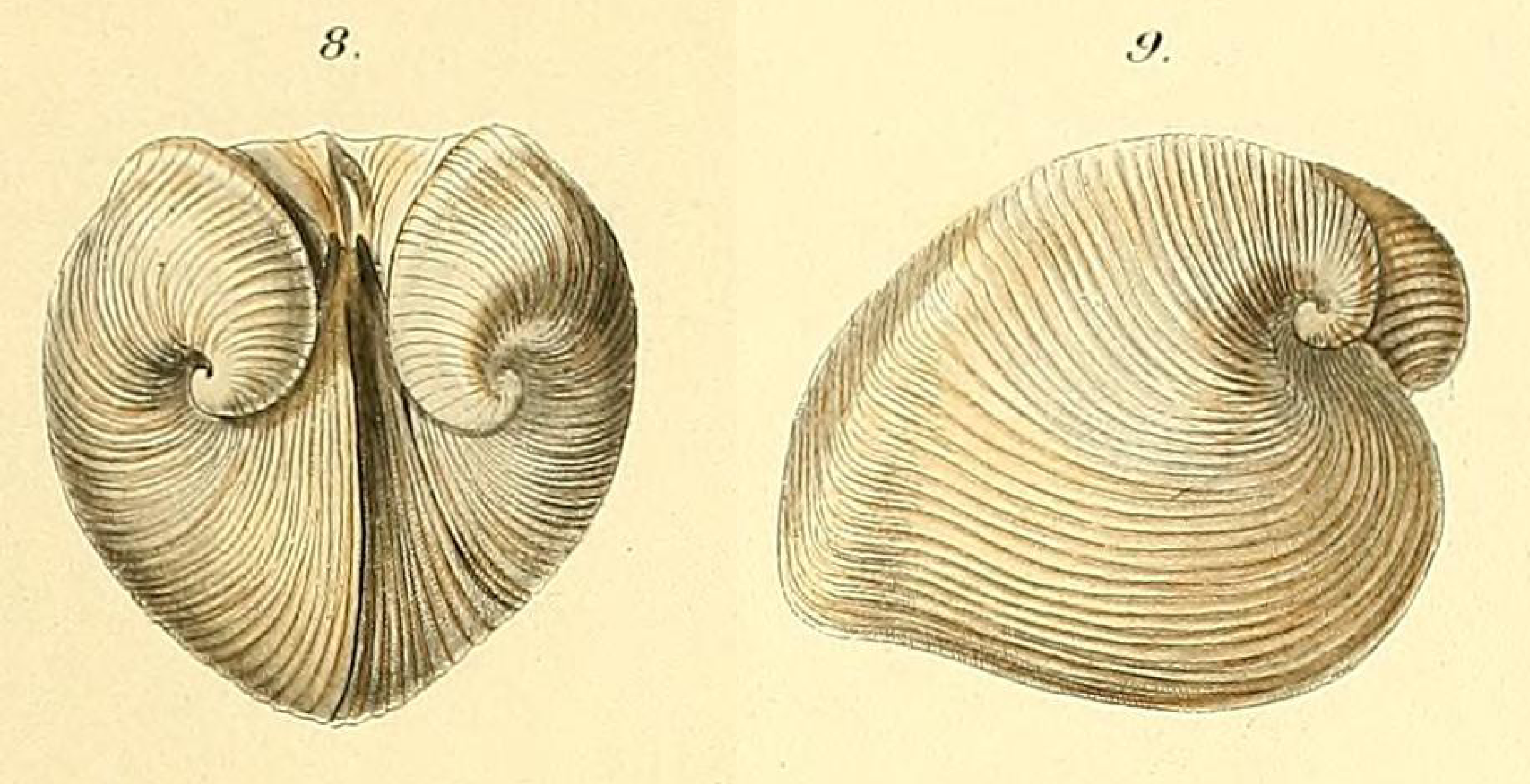

Scientific classification
- Kingdom: Animalia
- Phylum: Mollusca
- Class: Bivalvia
- Order: Venerida
- Superfamily: Glossoidea
- Family: Glossidae
- Genus: Meiocardia
- Species: M. vulgaris

Binomial name
- Meiocardia vulgaris (Reeve, 1845)

Synonyms
- Isocardia vulgaris Reeve, 1845; Meiocardia delicata Kosuge & Kage, 1994

= Meiocardia vulgaris =

Species of bivalve

Meiocardia delicata is a species of marine bivalve in the family Glossidae.

Right and left valve of the same specimen:

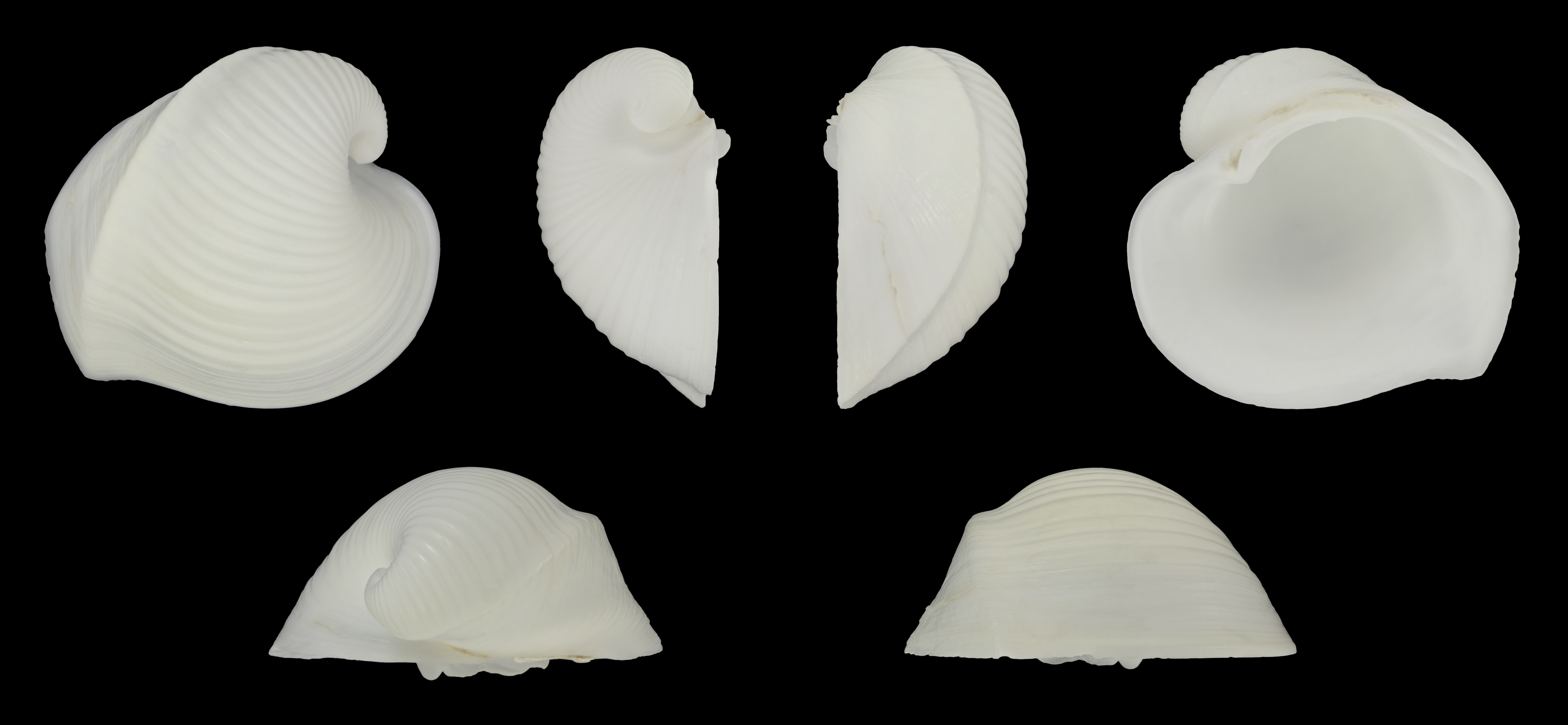
Right valve

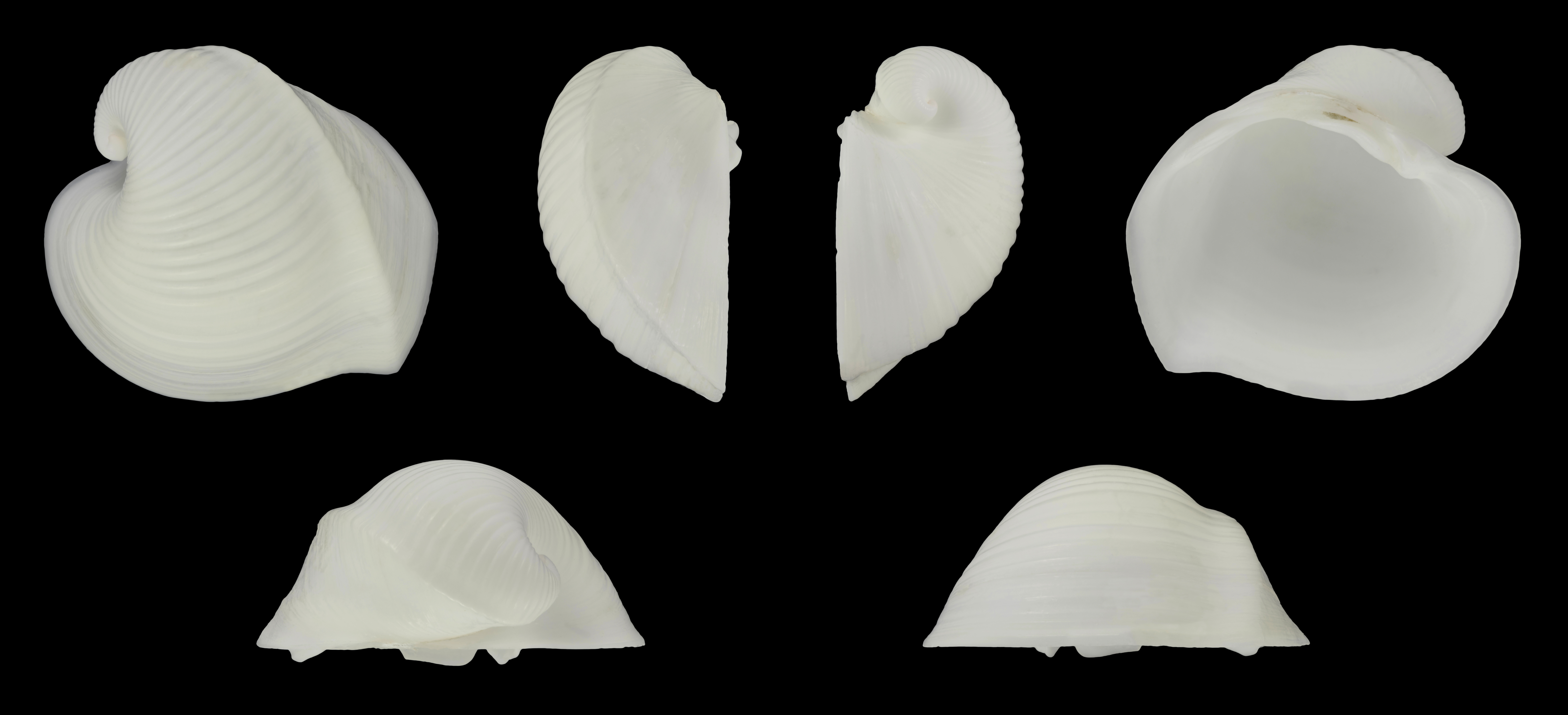
Left valve

== Taxonomy ==
Lovell Augustus Reeve described this species in 1845, placing it in the genus Isocardia.

In 1994, S. Kosuge & T. Kase described a junior synonym M. delicata; this was synonymized in 1995 by Akihiko Matsukuma and Tadashige Habe.

Reeve gave this species the specific epithet vulgaris "common" to reflect "the abundant importation of this once rare and highly praised shell."

== Distribution ==
The type locality of M. vulgaris and its junior synonym are China and Okinawa, Japan, respectively.

Its distribution includes: China, Taiwan, the Philippines, Malaysia, Indonesia, Queensland, Australia, the Andaman Islands, Myanmar, Northeast India, Oman, Zanzibar and Madagascar.
