= William Clapp =

William Clapp may refer to:

- William J. Clapp (1857–1934), American attorney and educator
- William H. Clapp (1879–1954), American painter and art curator
- William F. Clapp (1880–1951), specialist in mollusks at Harvard University's Museum of Comparative Zoology
- Bill Clapp, social entrepreneur, philanthropist and business executive
- Will Clapp (born 1995), American football center

== See also ==
- William Clapp House, a historic house in Dorchester, Massachusetts
