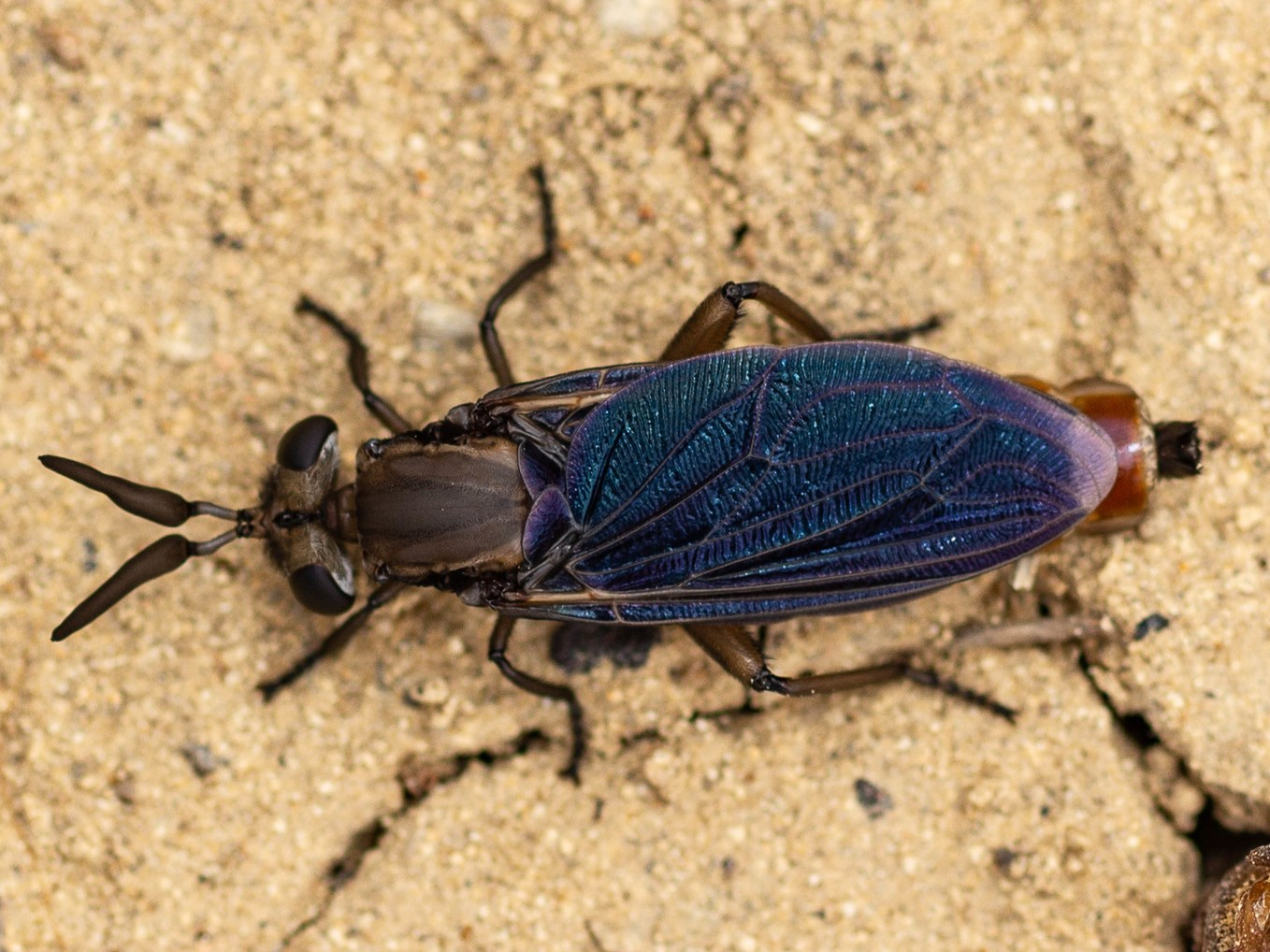
- Phyllomydas phyllocerus

Scientific classification
- Kingdom: Animalia
- Phylum: Arthropoda
- Class: Insecta
- Order: Diptera
- Family: Mydidae
- Subfamily: Mydinae
- Tribe: Phyllomydini
- Genus: Phyllomydas; Bigot, 1880

Type species
- Phyllomydas phyllocerus Bigot, 1880

= Phyllomydas =

Genus of flies

Phyllomydas is a genus of flies in the family Mydidae.

== Species ==
- Phyllomydas bruesii Johnson, 1926
- Phyllomydas currani Hardy, 1943
- Phyllomydas parvulus (Westwood, 1841)
- Phyllomydas phyllocerus Bigot, 1880
- Phyllomydas quercus Wilcox, 1978
- Phyllomydas scitulus (Williston, 1886)
- Phyllomydas weemsi Wilcox, 1978
