= Calliostoma bigelowi =

Scientific classification
- Kingdom: Animalia
- Phylum: Mollusca
- Class: Gastropoda
- Subclass: Vetigastropoda
- Order: Trochida
- Family: Calliostomatidae
- Genus: Calliostoma
- Species: C. bigelowi

Binomial name
- Calliostoma bigelowi Clench & Aguayo, 1938

Species of gastropod

Calliostoma bigelowi, common name Bigelow's top shell, is a species of sea snail, a marine gastropod mollusk in the family Calliostomatidae.

== Distribution ==
This species occurs in the Gulf of Mexico and the Caribbean Sea.

== Description ==
The maximum recorded shell length is 33.5 mm.

== Habitat ==
Minimum recorded depth is 375 m. Maximum recorded depth is 375 m.
