= Melanella doederleini =

- Shell of Melanella doederleini

Scientific classification
- Kingdom: Animalia
- Phylum: Mollusca
- Class: Gastropoda
- Subclass: Caenogastropoda
- Order: Littorinimorpha
- Family: Eulimidae
- Genus: Melanella
- Species: M. doederleini

Binomial name
- Melanella doederleini (Brusina, 1886)

Synonyms
- Eulima altavillensis G. Seguenza, 1876 (dubious synonym); Eulima doederleini Brusina, 1886; Eulima stalioi Brusina, 1869, sensu Jeffreys, 1884 ·

Species of gastropod

Melanella doederleini is a species of sea snail, a marine gastropod mollusk in the family Eulimidae. The species is one of a number within the genus Melanella.

== Distribution ==
This species occurs in the Atlantic Ocean off Spain, (Gulf of Cádiz)
