= Calliostoma torrei =

Scientific classification
- Kingdom: Animalia
- Phylum: Mollusca
- Class: Gastropoda
- Subclass: Vetigastropoda
- Order: Trochida
- Family: Calliostomatidae
- Genus: Calliostoma
- Species: C. torrei

Binomial name
- Calliostoma torrei Clench & Aguayo, 1940

Synonyms
- Calliostoma rugosum Quinn, 1992

Species of gastropod

Calliostoma torrei is a species of sea snail, a marine gastropod mollusk in the family Calliostomatidae.

== Description ==
The size of the shell varies between 20 mm and 41 mm.

== Distribution ==
This species occurs in the Caribbean Sea and the Gulf of Mexico at depths between 704 m and 863 m.
