= Lamellitrochus pourtalesi =

Scientific classification
- Kingdom: Animalia
- Phylum: Mollusca
- Class: Gastropoda
- Subclass: Vetigastropoda
- Order: Trochida
- Superfamily: Trochoidea
- Family: Solariellidae
- Genus: Lamellitrochus
- Species: L. pourtalesi

Binomial name
- Lamellitrochus pourtalesi (Clench & Aguayo, 1939)

Synonyms
- Margarita amabilis auct. non Jeffreys, 1865; Solariella pourtalesi Clench & Aguayo, 1939; Zetela pourtales (Clench, W.J. & C.G. Aguayo, 1939)

Species of gastropod

Lamellitrochus pourtalesi is a deep-sea species of sea snail, a marine gastropod mollusk in the family Solariellidae.

== Distribution ==
This species occurs in the Gulf of Mexico, the Caribbean Sea and off Puerto Rico at depths between 293 m and 2276 m.

== Description ==
The maximum recorded shell length is 10.3 mm.

== Habitat ==
Minimum recorded depth is 293 m. Maximum recorded depth is 2276 m.
