= Calliostoma barbouri =

Scientific classification
- Kingdom: Animalia
- Phylum: Mollusca
- Class: Gastropoda
- Subclass: Vetigastropoda
- Order: Trochida
- Family: Calliostomatidae
- Genus: Calliostoma
- Species: C. barbouri

Binomial name
- Calliostoma barbouri Clench & Aguayo, 1946

Species of gastropod

Calliostoma barbouri is a species of sea snail, a marine gastropod mollusk in the family Calliostomatidae.

== Distribution ==
This species occurs in the Caribbean Sea and the Gulf of Mexico.

== Description ==
The maximum recorded shell length is 25 mm.

== Habitat ==
Minimum recorded depth is 27 m. Maximum recorded depth is 192 m.
