= Phyllomydas bruesii =

Scientific classification
- Kingdom: Animalia
- Phylum: Arthropoda
- Class: Insecta
- Order: Diptera
- Family: Mydidae
- Subfamily: Mydinae
- Tribe: Phyllomydini
- Genus: Phyllomydas
- Species: P. bruesii

Binomial name
- Phyllomydas bruesii Johnson, 1926

Species of fly

Phyllomydas bruesii is a species of mydas fly in the family Mydidae.

== Distribution ==
Texas.
