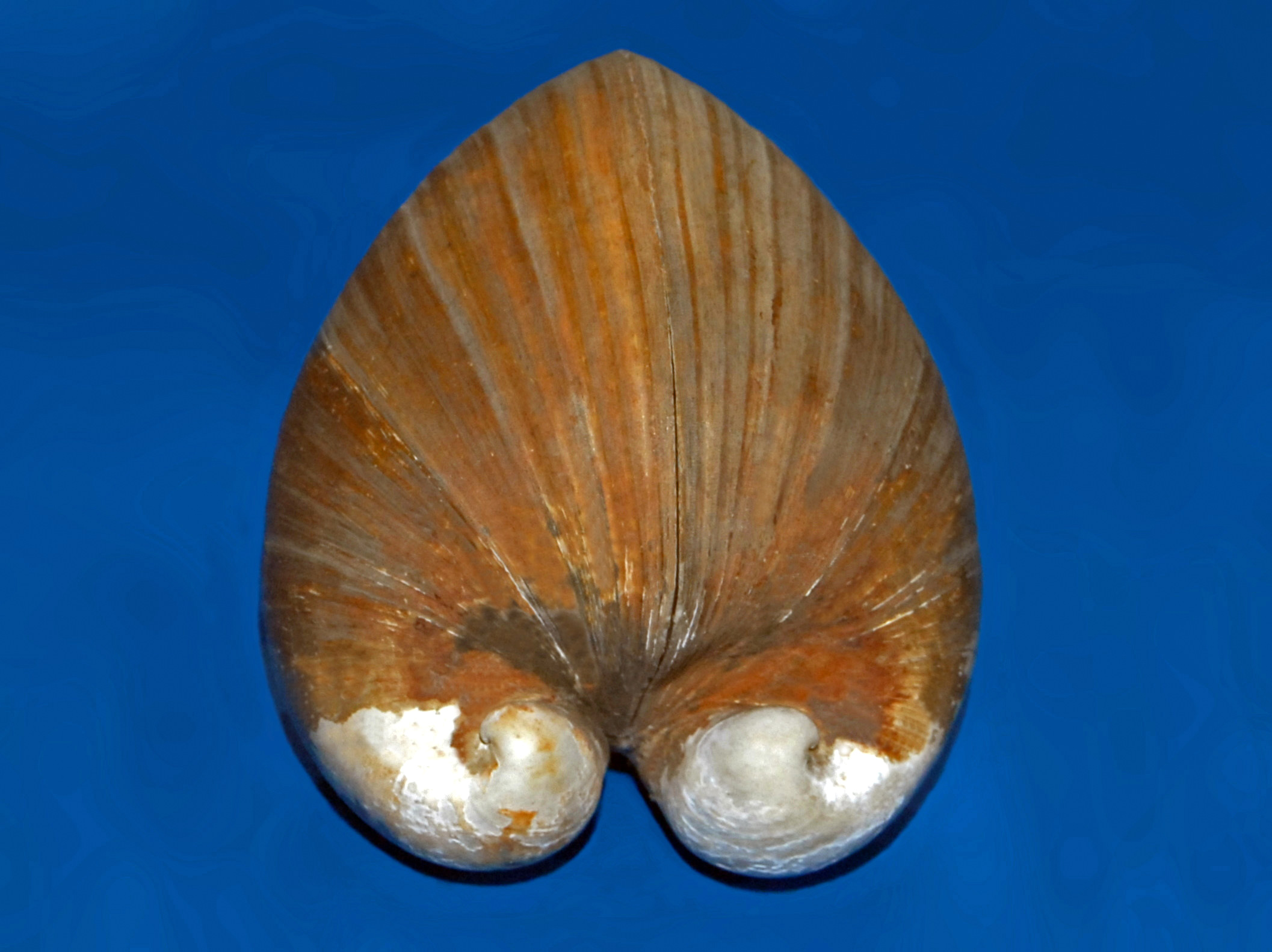
- Shell of Glossus humanus from Sicily at the Museo Civico di Storia Naturale di Milano

Scientific classification
- Kingdom: Animalia
- Phylum: Mollusca
- Class: Bivalvia
- Order: Venerida
- Superfamily: Glossoidea
- Family: Glossidae
- Genus: Glossus
- Species: G. humanus

Binomial name
- Glossus humanus (Linnaeus, 1758)

Synonyms
- Buccardium commune Megerle von Mühlfeld, 1811; Cardium humanum Linnaeus, 1758 (original combination); Chama cor Linnaeus, 1767; Glossus rubicundus Poli, 1795; Isocardia cor var. valentiana Pallary, 1903; Isocardia globosa Lamarck, 1801; Isocardia hibernica Reeve, 1845; Isocardia linnaei Locard, 1886; Isocardia lunulata Nyst, 18

= Glossus humanus =

Species of bivalve

Glossus humanus, the oxheart clam, is a species of species of marine clam found in deepwater off the Atlantic coastline of Europe and Northern Africa. It is the only remaining extant species in the genus Glossus.

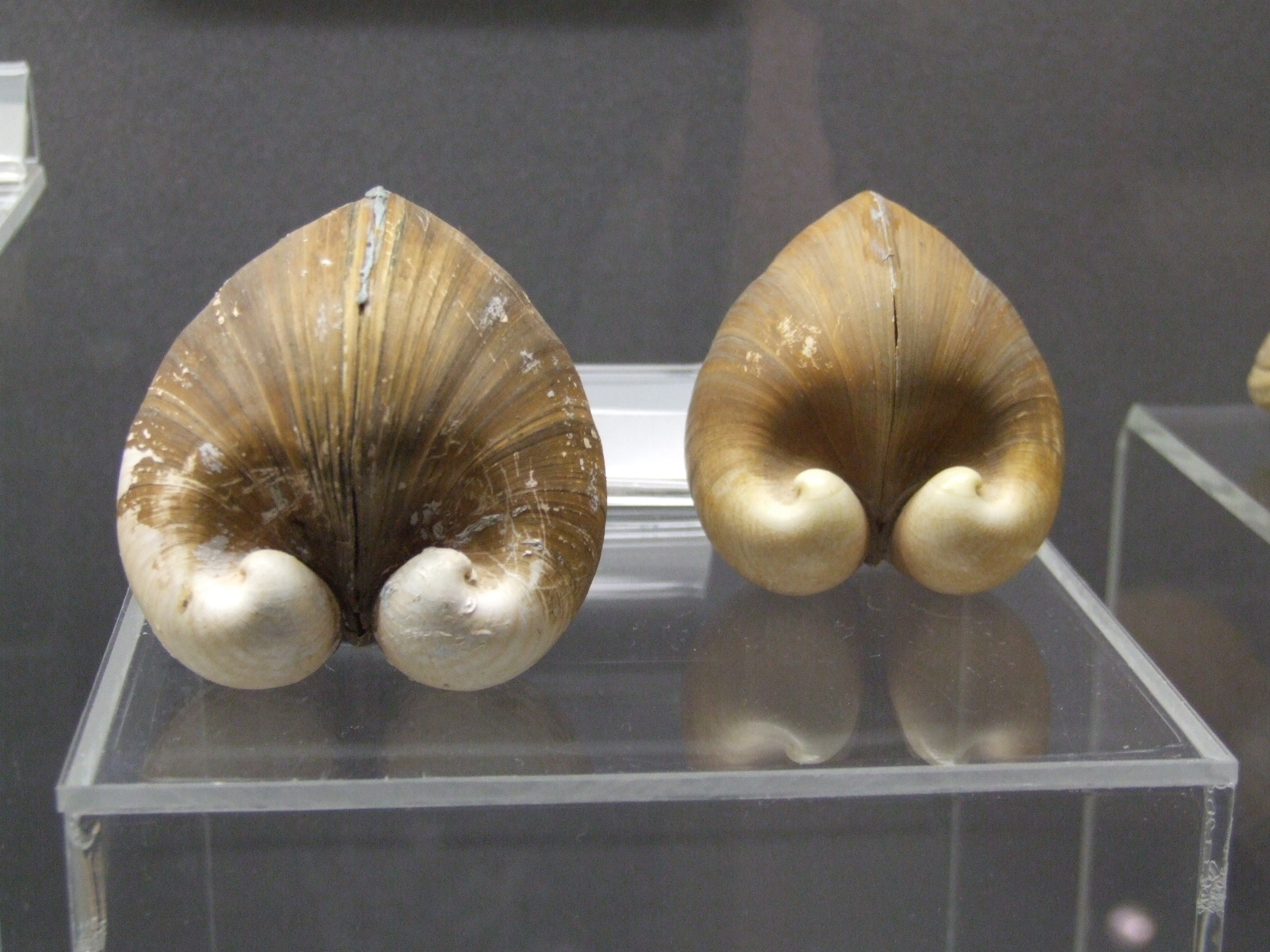
The shell of Glossus humanus at the Thalassa Museum

== Description ==
Glossus humanus has a shell reaching up to 160 mm in length, but usually it is between 60 and 80 mm. This shell is globular with a subcircular outline. The two valves viewed from the side are heart shaped, forming the outline of a human heart (hence the original species name, Cardium humanum). The walls of the shell are quite thin, equivalve, with a light weight. The outer surface usually is dark brown or olive green, with fine radial lines and frequently covered with short hairs. Glossus humanus lives half buried into the substratum, exposing only the lower margin of the shell and the siphon. It feeds on plankton and other microscopic particles that it filters out with its gills. Spawning occurs at the end of September.

Right and left valve of the same specimen:

Right valve

Left valve

== Distribution ==
This species can be found in the eastern Atlantic Ocean from Iceland and Norway to Morocco, Mediterranean Sea and Adriatic Sea.

== Habitat ==
This species occurs in soft muddy or sandy substrates, from depths of 7 m up to 250 m, but more frequently below 50 m.
