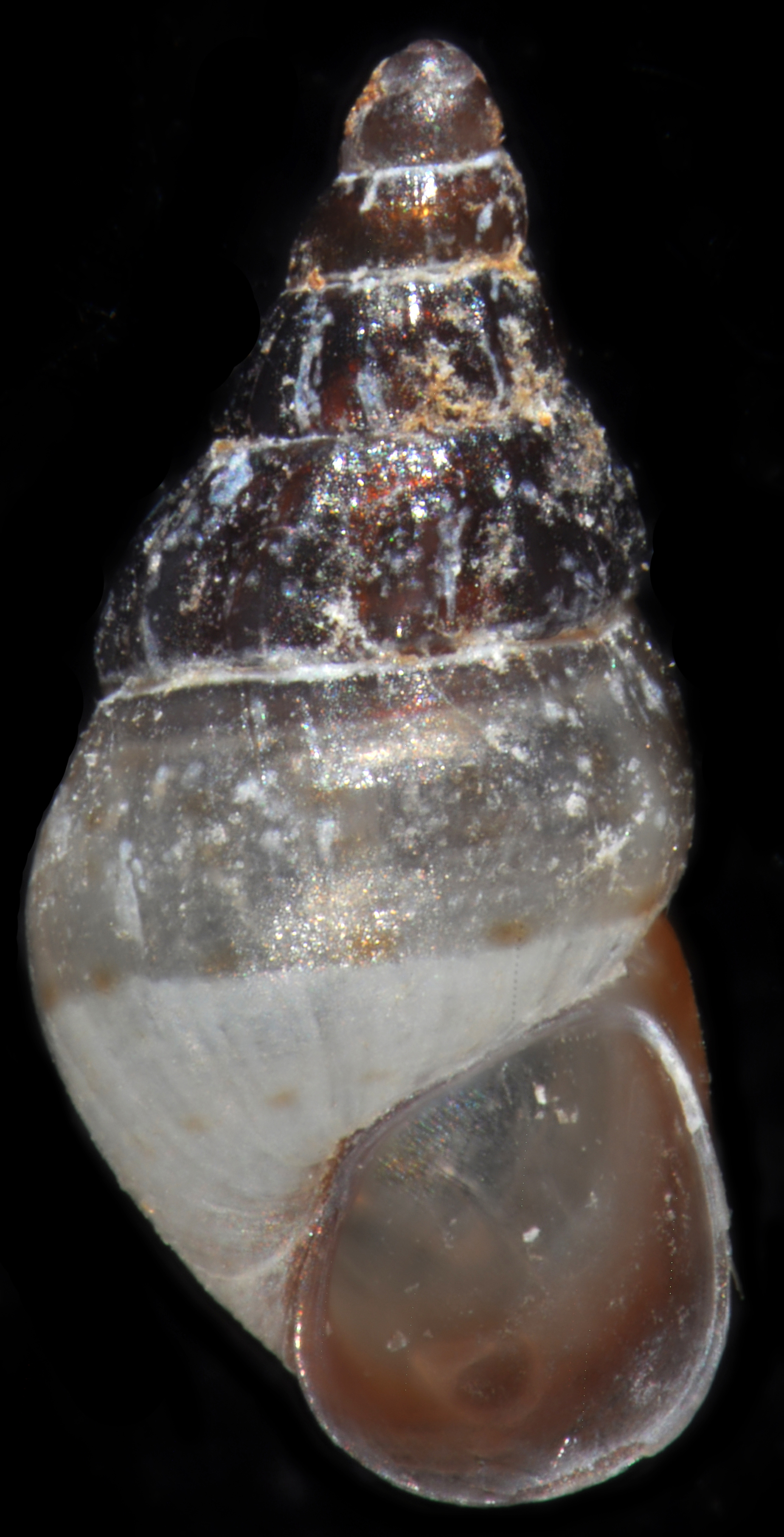
- Shell of Alvania electa (holotype at MNHN, Paris)

Scientific classification
- Kingdom: Animalia
- Phylum: Mollusca
- Class: Gastropoda
- Subclass: Caenogastropoda
- Order: Littorinimorpha
- Superfamily: Rissooidea
- Family: Rissoidae
- Genus: Alvania
- Species: A. electa

Binomial name
- Alvania electa (Monterosato, 1874)

Synonyms
- Alvania deliciosa (Jeffreys, 1884); Rissoa deliciosa Jeffreys, 1884; Rissoa electa Monterosato, 1874

= Alvania electa =

Species of gastropod

Alvania electa is a species of small sea snail, a marine gastropod mollusk or micromollusk in the family Rissoidae.

== Distribution ==
This species occurs in the Western Mediterranean Sea; also in the Gulf of Cadiz and off Madeira.
