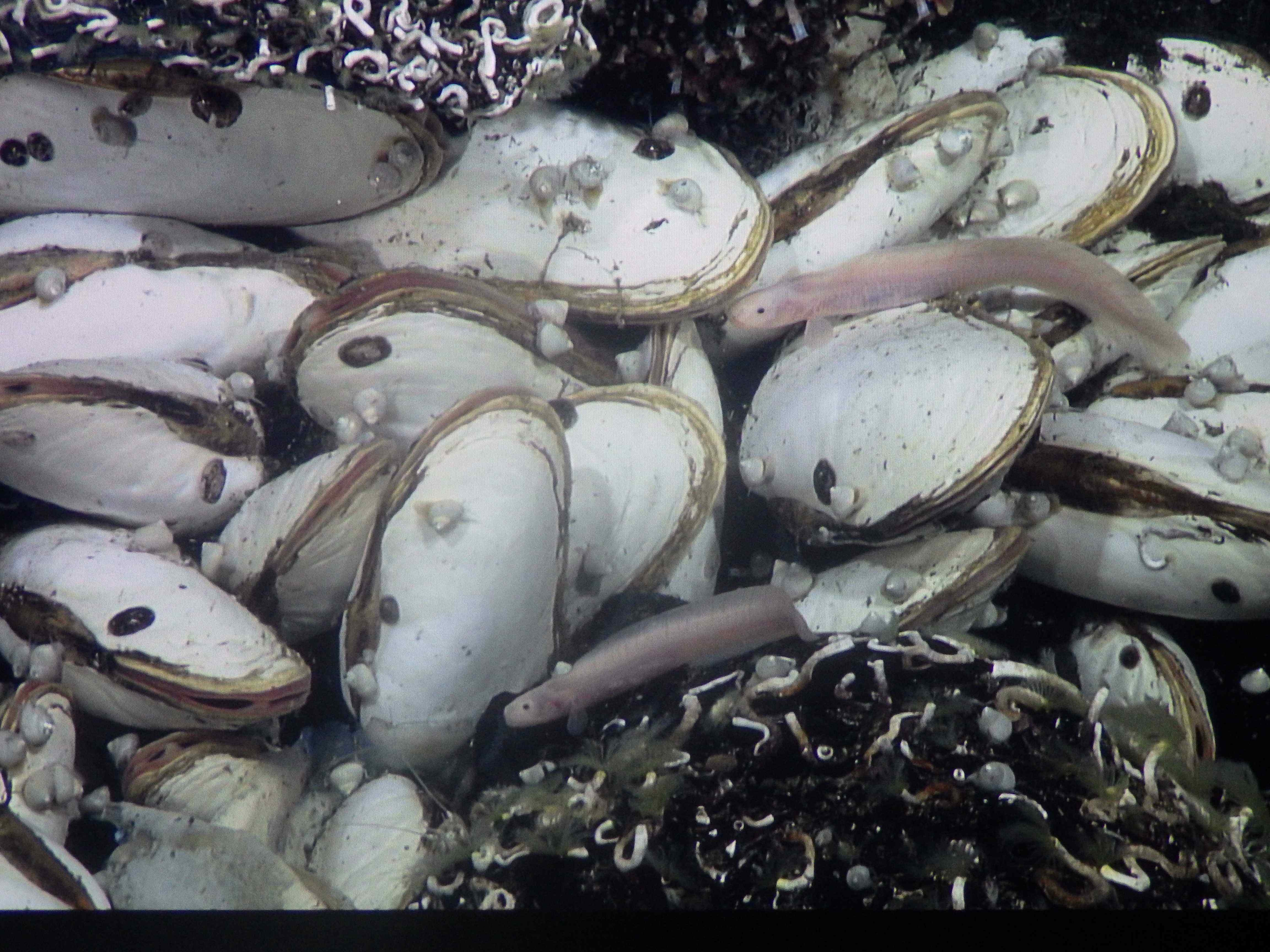

Conservation status
- Near Threatened (IUCN 3.1)

Scientific classification
- Kingdom: Animalia
- Phylum: Mollusca
- Class: Bivalvia
- Order: Venerida
- Superfamily: Glossoidea
- Family: Vesicomyidae
- Genus: Calyptogena
- Species: C. magnifica

Binomial name
- Calyptogena magnifica Boss & Turner, 1980

= Calyptogena magnifica =

Species of mollusc

Calyptogena magnifica is a species of giant white clam native to the Pacific, found around hydrothermal vents and cold seeps ranging from Mexico to the Galapagos Rift.

== Description ==
The systematics of the family Vesicomyidae is unclear because of the small number of specimens collected, the variability between specimens of the same species and their wide dispersal in isolated, deep water locations. The morphology of Calyptogena magnifica resembles another member of the genus, Calyptogena elongata, the type locality of which is several hundred miles further north. C elongata is only known from three small specimens and the size of mature individuals is unknown.

=== Morphology ===
The two valves of Calyptogena magnifica are oval or slightly kidney-shaped and about two times as long as they are high. The umbones are towards the anterior end of the valve and the growth rings are most noticeable near the margins. The shell material is thick, and the exterior is white and usually chalky in appearance. The periostracum is yellowish brown, wrinkled and loose. The ligament is external and there are several U-shaped cardinal hinge teeth on each valve. The largest specimen so far collected has a valve length of 263 millimetres (10.4 in). The mantle is an iridescent purplish pink and there is a large pink protrusible foot divided into two portions. The two separate siphons are short and do not extend beyond the edge of the valves. The pallial sinus is small. The gills are large and thick and the visceral mass is red due to the haemoglobin in the blood, which is uncharacteristic of a bivalve.

== Distribution and discovery ==
Calyptogena magnifica was first described by Kenneth Boss and Ruth Turner of Harvard's Museum of Comparative Zoology in 1980, following its discovery during research dives by the submersible vehicle DSV Alvin to the floor of the Pacific Ocean in 1977 and 1979. The clam was also one of the first to be described after the discovery of hydrothermal vents.

The location of the hydrothermal vent where it was found was approximately 200 miles (320 km) west of Punta Mita, Mexico at a depth of 2,645 metres (8,678 ft). Further deep water exploration shows that it is present at other hydrothermal vents on the East Pacific Rise between 21°N and 22°S. Additionally a 2002 expedition conducted by scientists from the Woods Hole Oceanographic Institution (WHOI) and NOAA's Pacific Marine Environmental Laboratory discovered communities of Calyptogena magnifica along the Galapagos Rift, naming the vent site "Calyfield" after the clam. In some locations the clam is plentiful while in other, apparently suitable habitats, it is not present at all.

== Biology ==
Calyptogena magnifica is assumed to burrow and it is thought the divided foot may be specially adapted for insertion into cracks in hard substrates or among mussels (Bathymodiolus thermophilus). The organism can move around on the sea floor with its muscular foot and usually takes up a vertical position rather than lying flat. However, these white clams have low mobility. Calyptogena magnifica have slow growth rates, with its growth rate decreasing with age, and have been found to live almost 50 years. Research has also shown that the hydrothermal vent clams can record environmental changes in their shells. Growth bands in the shell, similar to tree rings, are composed of varying amounts of strontium/calcium along with other metals that reflect the varying composition of hydrothermal vent mineral flow, reflecting changes in volcanic or tectonic activity. As the shell grows slowly, changes in environmental composition can be logged from years to decades.

=== Chemosynthetic Symbionts ===
Calyptogena magnifica is specially adapted to life around hydrothermal vents by the chemosymbiotic bacteria, Candidatus Ruthia magnifica, which was the first intracellular sulfur-oxidizing endosymbiont that had its entire genome sequenced. While other deep-sea organisms have lost their guts entirely, Calyptogena magnifica still maintains a rudimentary gut and feeding groove. The presence of these two characteristics suggests that while the clam still possesses a digestive tract, it is rudimentary, illustrating a reliance on endosymbionts in order to gain nutrition. It is thought that divided foot acts as a feeding tube, taking up sulfide from the vent water in the rock, which is then transported to the gills. The white clams have a reduced gut and ciliary food grove, and relies on these symbionts for all of its nutrition. These bacteria oxidize hydrogen sulfide seeping from the vents, consequently producing organic carbon and nitrogen for the clams' nutrition and energy. The symbionts fix carbon using energy from sulfur oxidation, allowing the clams to absorb the nutrients then produced rather than photosynthetically derived products. This bacterial symbiont, encodes extensive range of pathways for chemosynthesis and biosynthesis. It is predicted that Candidatus Ruthia magnifica has the ability to produce 20 amino acids, 10 vitamins, and other necessary nutrients for white clams' metabolic processes. Additionally, studies have shown that the respiration rates of Calyptogena magnifica are primarily determined by the amount of sulfide produced in the sediment as opposed to methane fluxes. This reliance illustrates the clam's reliance on its sulfide-oxidizing symbionts in regards to respiration.

=== Reproduction ===
Little is known of the reproduction and life cycle of Calyptogena magnifica but examination of specimens brought up from the deep showed numerous large oocytes with yolks in various stages of development among the visceral mass. Researchers thought this might mean that the clam had poor dispersal abilities but a study using rDNA analysis showed that larvae did in fact disperse to other vents throughout its range. Hydrothermal vents emit hot, sulfur-rich water for several years and then cease to flow. This results in the death of the community surrounding them, and for the continuing existence of their species, there is a need for the larvae of these animals to have dispersed to other existing vents and for them to exploit new vents when they open up.

== Ecology ==
Calyptogena magnifica is found near hydrothermal vents in the deep sea floor where it is part of a rich benthic community. The species lives on mid-ocean ridges and typically dies if the vent shuts down.

A 1980 study described a large number of mussels and some large galatheid crabs walking over the bed of bivalves, while shrimps and octopuses were also observed in the vicinity. Around the vent, these white clams lodge themselves in crevices of basalt along the ocean floor, called "clambakes." In these crevices, there is a vent flow of warm water rich with carbon dioxide and hydrogen sulfide, which the clams take up for their symbiont bacteria to use.
