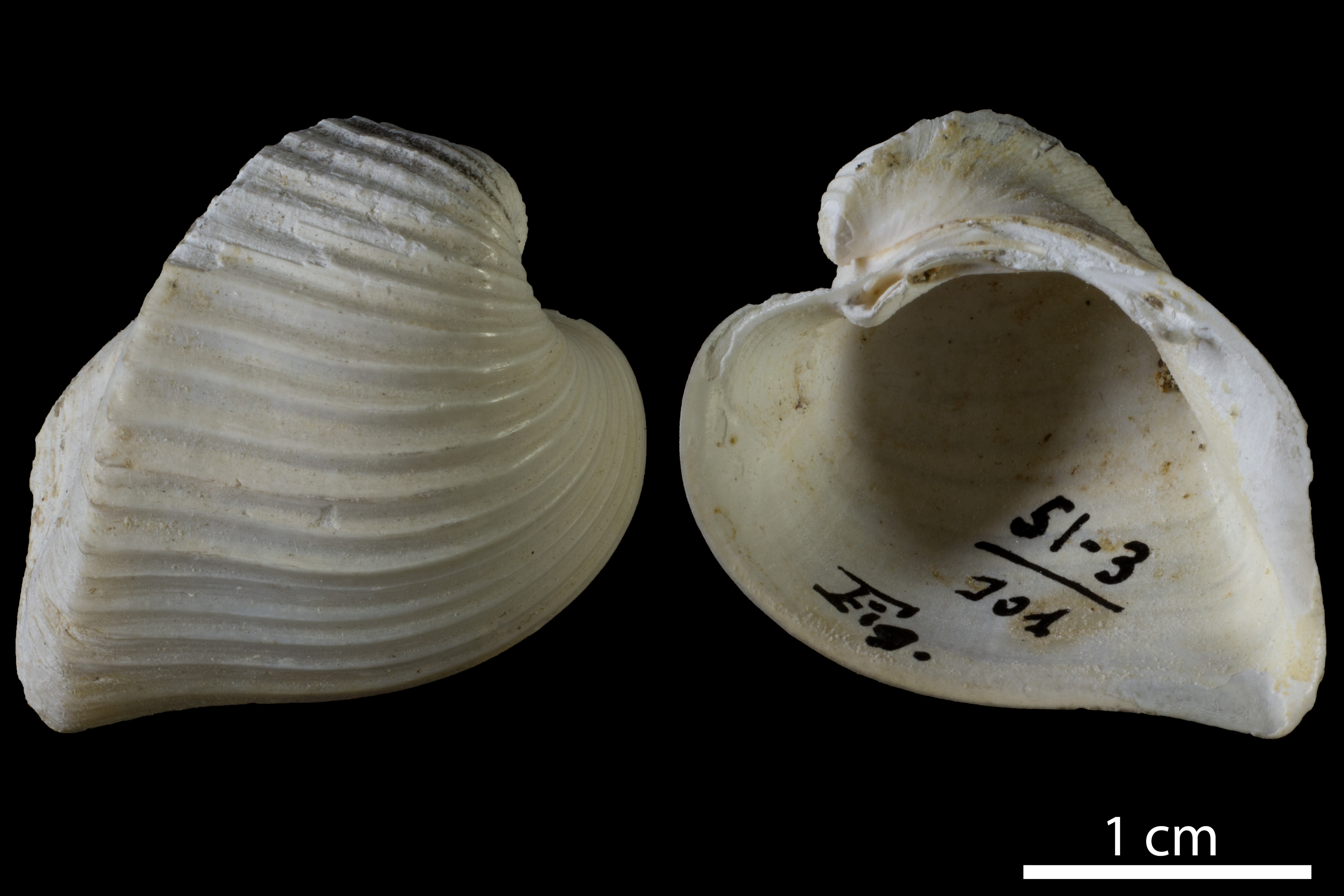
- M. moltkiana fossil in the MNHN

Scientific classification
- Kingdom: Animalia
- Phylum: Mollusca
- Class: Bivalvia
- Order: Venerida
- Superfamily: Glossoidea
- Family: Glossidae
- Genus: Meiocardia; H. Adams & A. Adams, 1857

Type species
- Chama moltkiana Gmelin, 1791

Species
- See text.

Synonyms
- Bucardia (Meiocardia) H. Adams & A. Adams, 1857; Glossus (Meiocardia) H. Adams & A. Adams, 1857; †Isocardia (Meiocardia) H. Adams & A. Adams, 1857; Isocardia (Miocardia) P. Fischer, 1887; †Miocardia P. Fischer, 1887

= Meiocardia =

Meiocardia Temporal range: Maastrichtian–present, 72.1–0 Ma

Genus of bivalves

Meiocardia is a genus of marine bivalves in the family Glossidae.

== Species ==
The following species are recognised in the genus Meiocardia:

- Meiocardia cumingi (A. Adams, 1864)
- †Meiocardia faxensis (Lundgren, 1867)
- †Meiocardia floridana (Dall, 1900)
- Meiocardia hawaiana Dall, Bartsch & Rehder, 1938
- †Meiocardia incognita Zubkovitsch, 1961
- Meiocardia moltkiana (Gmelin, 1791)
- †Meiocardia palmerae Nicol, 1968
- Meiocardia samarangiae Bernard, Cai & Morton, 1993
- Meiocardia sanguineomaculata (Dunker, 1882)
- †Meiocardia septemcostata Wanner & Hahn, 1935
- †Meiocardia subcumingii (H. Woodward, 1879)
- †Meiocardia susukii Squires & Advocate, 1986
- Meiocardia vulgaris (Reeve, 1845)
