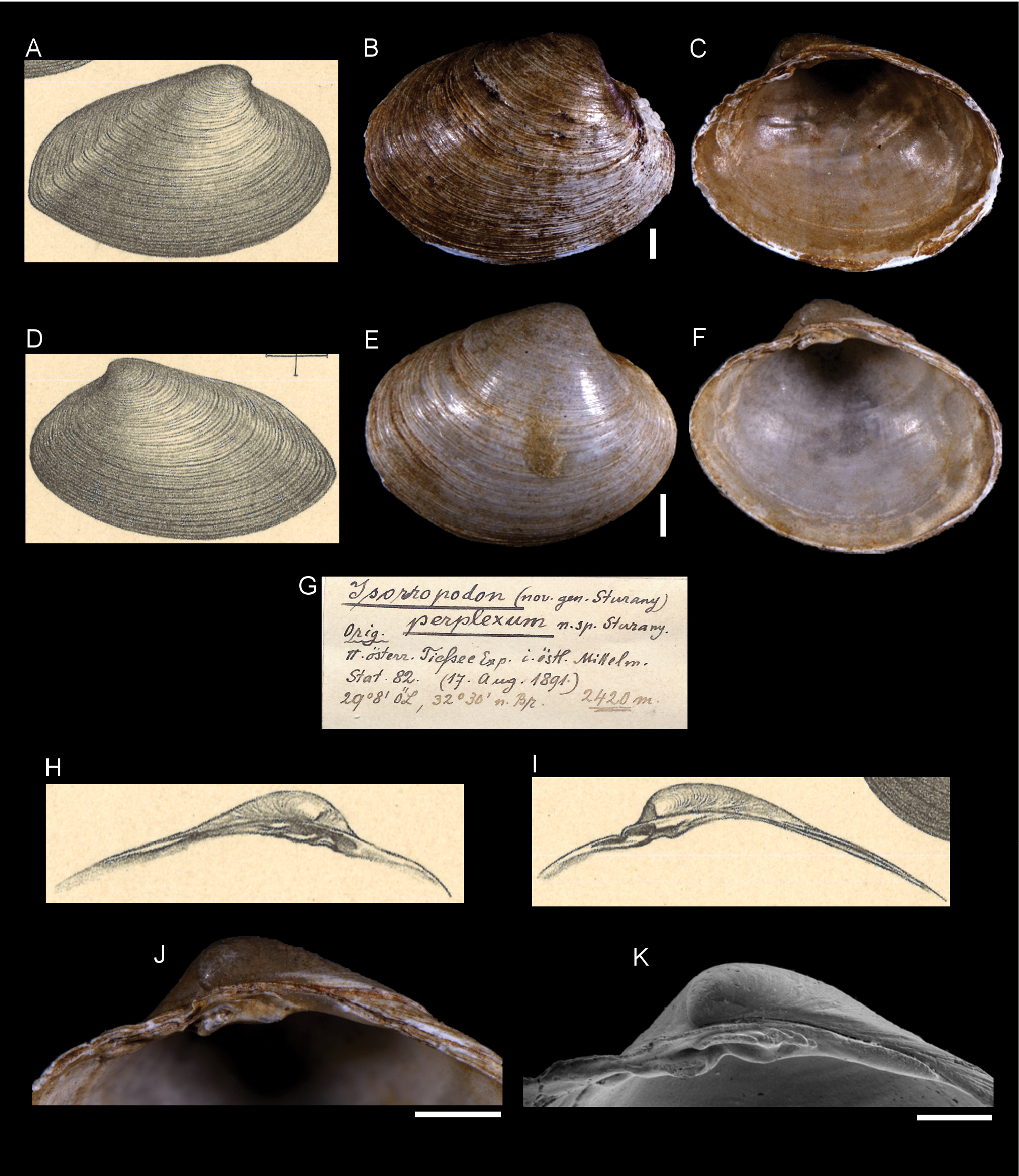
- Eastern Mediterranean molluscs

Scientific classification
- Kingdom: Animalia
- Phylum: Mollusca
- Class: Bivalvia
- Order: Venerida
- Family: Vesicomyidae
- Genus: Isorropodon; Sturany, 1896

Type species
- Isorropodon perplexus Sturany, 1896

= Isorropodon =

Genus of deep-sea bivalve molluscs

Isorropodon is a genus of small deep-sea bivalve molluscs in the family Vesicomyidae and subfamily Pliocardiinae. The genus was first described by Austrian naturalist Rudolf Sturany in 1896, and is known for its small size relative to other vesicomyids, as well as its unique biological adaptation to chemosynthetic environments.

== Ecology and biology ==
In contrast to most filter-feeding surface bivalves, the genus Isorropodon is chemosymbiotic. There is only one bacterial symbiont phylotype found inside the gills of the genus, enabling it to use chemical energy produced by chemosynthesis through hydrogen sulfide or methane.

Isorropodon species are only found in deep-sea habitats including cold seeps, hydrocarbon-rich mud volcanoes, seamounts and areas with submerged deep-sea plant debris. They are usually under 16mm and their geographical range spans from the Mediterranean Sea to the Atlantic Ocean and north into the Arctic basin.

== Description ==
The shell structure of Isorropodon is usually small, fragile, thin, and smooth. The shell shape is usually elliptical or subovate.

== Species ==
According to the World Register of Marine Species the genus Isorropodon currently contains the following recognized species.

- Isorropodon arguinensis L. Hoffmann, Cosel & Freiwald, 2019
- Isorropodon bigoti Cosel & C. Salas, 2001
- Isorropodon curtus Cosel & C. Salas, 2001
- Isorropodon elongatus J. A. Allen, 2001
- Isorropodon kaikoae Okutani, Fujikura & Kojima, 2000
- Isorropodon mackayi P. G. Oliver & Drewery, 2014
- Isorropodon megadesmus P. G. Oliver, Rodrigues & M. Cunha, 2011
- Isorropodon nyeggaensis Krylova, 2011
- Isorropodon perplexus Sturany, 1896 (Type species)
- Isorropodon smithii Dall, 1889
- Isorropodon striatus Jaeckel & Thiele, 1931
- Isorropodon tenina J. A. Allen, 2001

The genus also contains two extinct species.

- Isorropodon frankfortensis Amano & Kiel, 2007
- Isorropodon humptulipsensis Kiel, Amano & Goedert, 2023
