= Lamellitrochus filosus =

Scientific classification
- Kingdom: Animalia
- Phylum: Mollusca
- Class: Gastropoda
- Subclass: Vetigastropoda
- Order: Trochida
- Superfamily: Trochoidea
- Family: Solariellidae
- Genus: Lamellitrochus
- Species: L. filosus

Binomial name
- Lamellitrochus filosus Quinn, 1991

Species of gastropod

Lamellitrochus filosus is a species of sea snail, a marine gastropod mollusk in the family Solariellidae.

== Description ==
The size of the snail's shell attains 3.2 mm.

== Distribution ==
This marine species occurs in the Lesser Antilles off of the island of Antigua.
