= Lamellitrochus bicoronatus =

Scientific classification
- Kingdom: Animalia
- Phylum: Mollusca
- Class: Gastropoda
- Subclass: Vetigastropoda
- Order: Trochida
- Superfamily: Trochoidea
- Family: Solariellidae
- Genus: Lamellitrochus
- Species: L. bicoronatus

Binomial name
- Lamellitrochus bicoronatus Quinn, 1991

Species of gastropod

Lamellitrochus bicoronatus is a species of sea snail, a marine gastropod mollusk in the family Solariellidae.

== Description ==
The length of the conico-turbinate shell attains 10 mm, but is usually less than 5 mm. Its typical characteristic is the subsutural angulation and the cord around the umbilicus formed by double rows of rounded tubercles.

== Distribution ==
This species occurs in the Caribbean Sea off Barbados at a depth of 183 m.
