= Phyllomydas currani =

Scientific classification
- Kingdom: Animalia
- Phylum: Arthropoda
- Class: Insecta
- Order: Diptera
- Family: Mydidae
- Subfamily: Mydinae
- Tribe: Phyllomydini
- Genus: Phyllomydas
- Species: P. currani

Binomial name
- Phyllomydas currani Hardy, 1943

Species of fly

Phyllomydas currani is a species of mydas flies (insects in the family Mydidae).

== Distribution ==
New Mexico.
