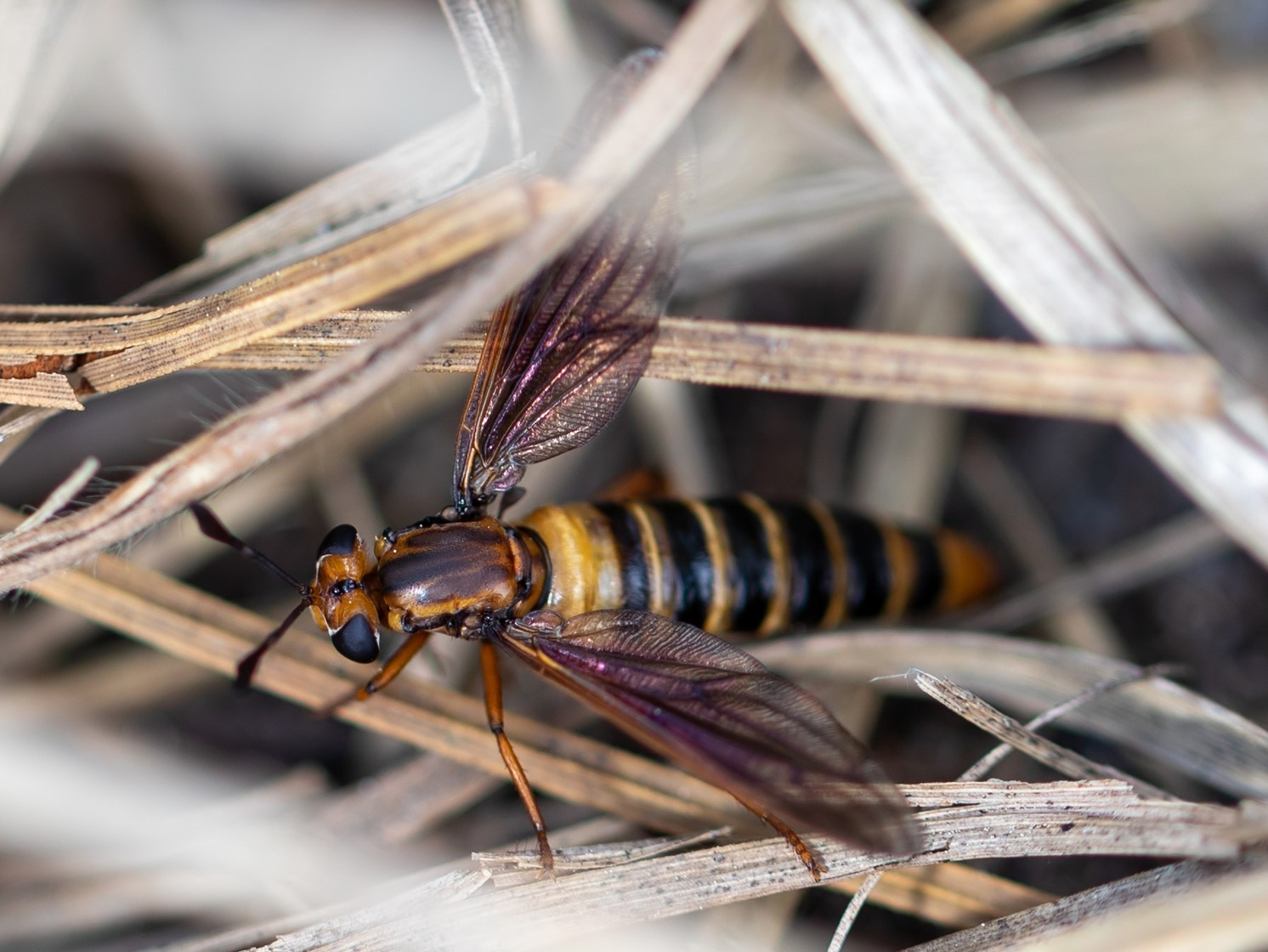

Scientific classification
- Kingdom: Animalia
- Phylum: Arthropoda
- Clade: Pancrustacea
- Class: Insecta
- Order: Diptera
- Family: Mydidae
- Subfamily: Mydinae
- Tribe: Phyllomydini
- Genus: Phyllomydas
- Species: P. parvulus

Binomial name
- Phyllomydas parvulus (Westwood, 1841)

Synonyms
- Mydas parvulus Westwood, 1841

= Phyllomydas parvulus =

Species of fly

Phyllomydas parvulus is a species of mydas fly in the family Mydidae.

== Distribution ==
The species is found in Florida.
