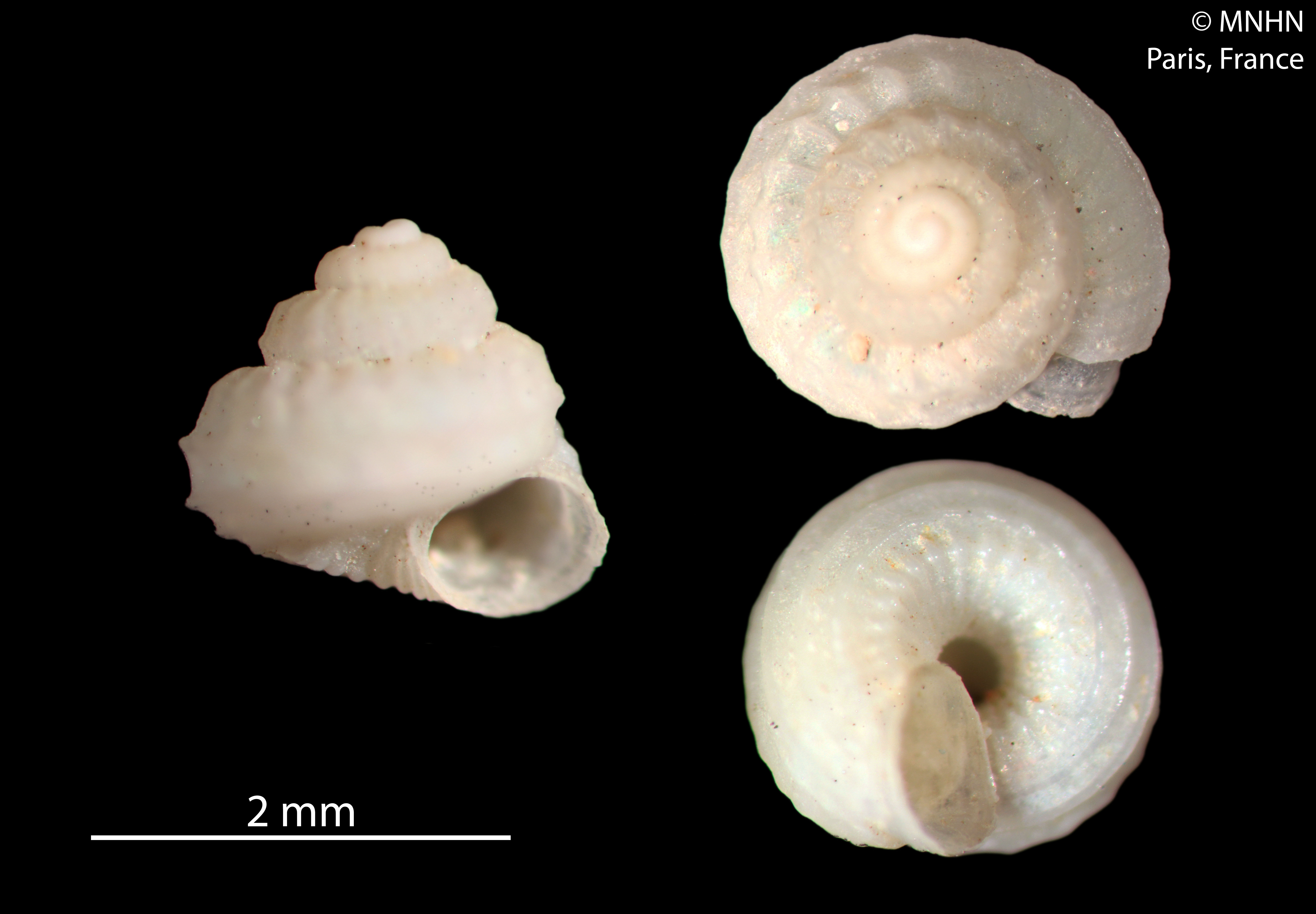

Scientific classification
- Kingdom: Animalia
- Phylum: Mollusca
- Class: Gastropoda
- Subclass: Vetigastropoda
- Order: Trochida
- Superfamily: Trochoidea
- Family: Solariellidae
- Genus: Lamellitrochus
- Species: L. carinatus

Binomial name
- Lamellitrochus carinatus Quinn, 1991

= Lamellitrochus carinatus =

Species of gastropod

Lamellitrochus carinatus is a species of sea snail, a marine gastropod mollusk in the family Solariellidae.

== Distribution ==
The species is found primarily in the Gulf of Mexico.

== Description ==
The maximum recorded shell length is 2.9 mm. at depths between 60 m and 200 m.

== Habitat ==
Minimum recorded depth is 60 m. Maximum recorded depth is 200 m.
