= Lamellitrochus suavis =

Scientific classification
- Kingdom: Animalia
- Phylum: Mollusca
- Class: Gastropoda
- Subclass: Vetigastropoda
- Order: Trochida
- Superfamily: Trochoidea
- Family: Solariellidae
- Genus: Lamellitrochus
- Species: L. suavis

Binomial name
- Lamellitrochus suavis Quinn, 1991

Species of gastropod

Lamellitrochus suavis is a species of sea snail, a marine gastropod mollusk in the family Solariellidae. They tend to be bottom feeders whose trophic guild is Deposit feeder. Their habitat tends to be "Marine Benthic".

== Description ==
The shell grows to a length of 3.4 mm. The shell is dextrally coiled and its method of transportation is Mucus Mediated Gliding.

== Distribution ==
This marine species was found off Barbados. It has also had two findings in the Gulf of Mexico.
