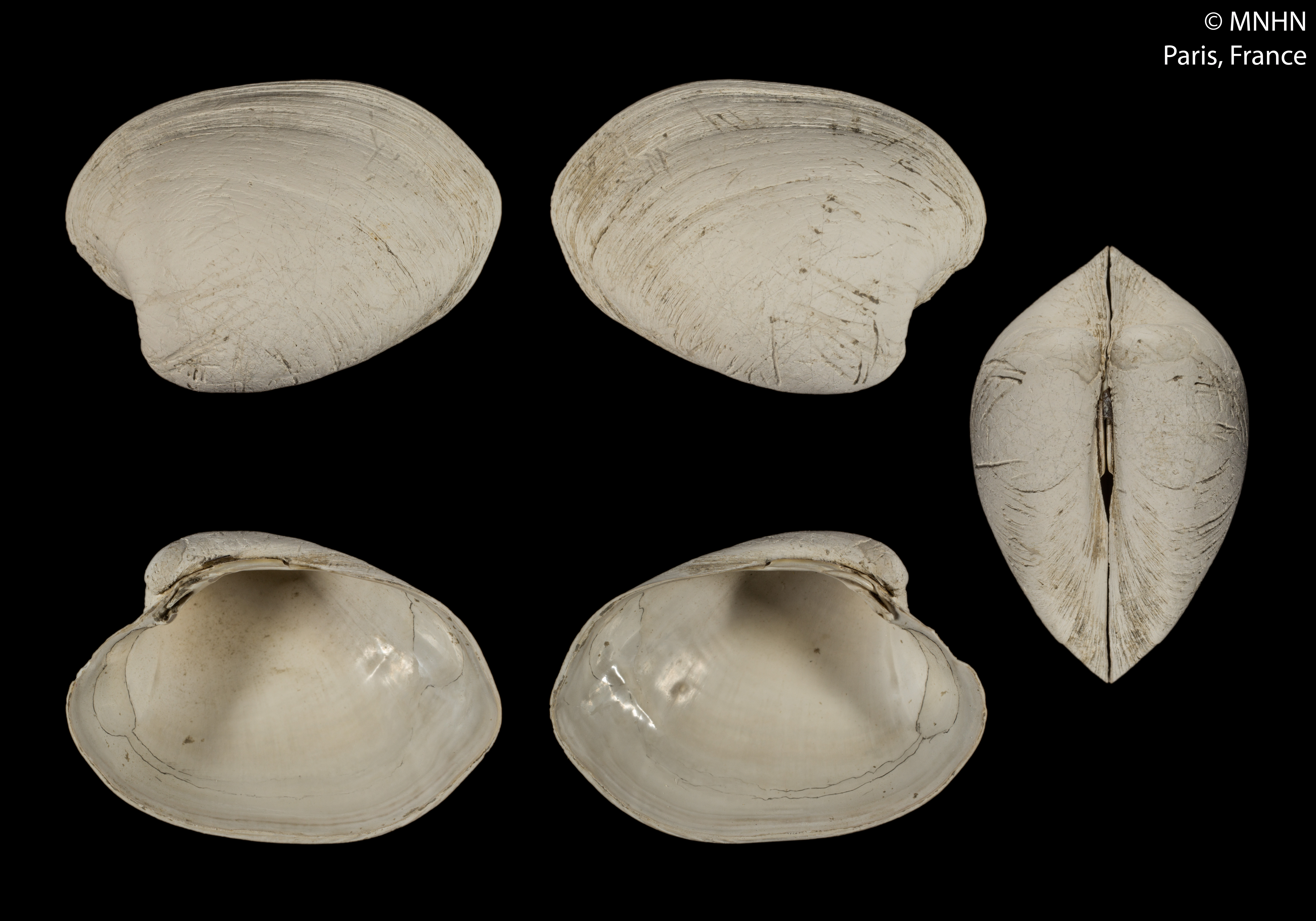
- Shell of Pliocardia atalantae (holotype at MNHN, Paris)

Scientific classification
- Domain: Eukaryota
- Kingdom: Animalia
- Phylum: Mollusca
- Class: Bivalvia
- Order: Venerida
- Superfamily: Glossoidea
- Family: Vesicomyidae
- Genus: Pliocardia; Woodring, 1925

Type species
- † Anomalocardia bowdeniana Dall, 1903

= Pliocardia =

Genus of bivalve molluscs

Pliocardia is a genus of saltwater clams, marine bivalve molluscs in the family Vesicomyidae.

== Species ==
- Pliocardia atalantae (Cosel & Olu, 2009)
- † Pliocardia bowdeniana (Dall, 1903)
- Pliocardia caribbea (Boss, 1967)
- Pliocardia cordata (Boss, 1968)
- Pliocardia crenulomarginata (Okutani, Kojima & Iwasaki, 2002)
- Pliocardia donacia (Dall, 1908)
- Pliocardia hayashii (Habe, 1976)
- Pliocardia indica (E. A. Smith, 1904)
- † Pliocardia italica Kiel & Taviani, 2017
- † Pliocardia kawadai (Aoki, 1954)
- Pliocardia krylovata A. M. Martin & Goffredi, 2012
- Pliocardia kuroshimana (Okutani, Fujikura & Kojima, 2000)
- Pliocardia ovalis (Dall, 1896)
- Pliocardia ponderosa (Boss, 1968)
- Pliocardia solidissima (Prashad, 1932)
- Pliocardia stearnsii (Dall, 1895)
- † Pliocardia tanakai Miyajima, Nobuhara & Koike, 2017
- Pliocardia ticaonica (Dall, 1908)
