= Gulf of Cádiz =

Arm of the Atlantic Ocean

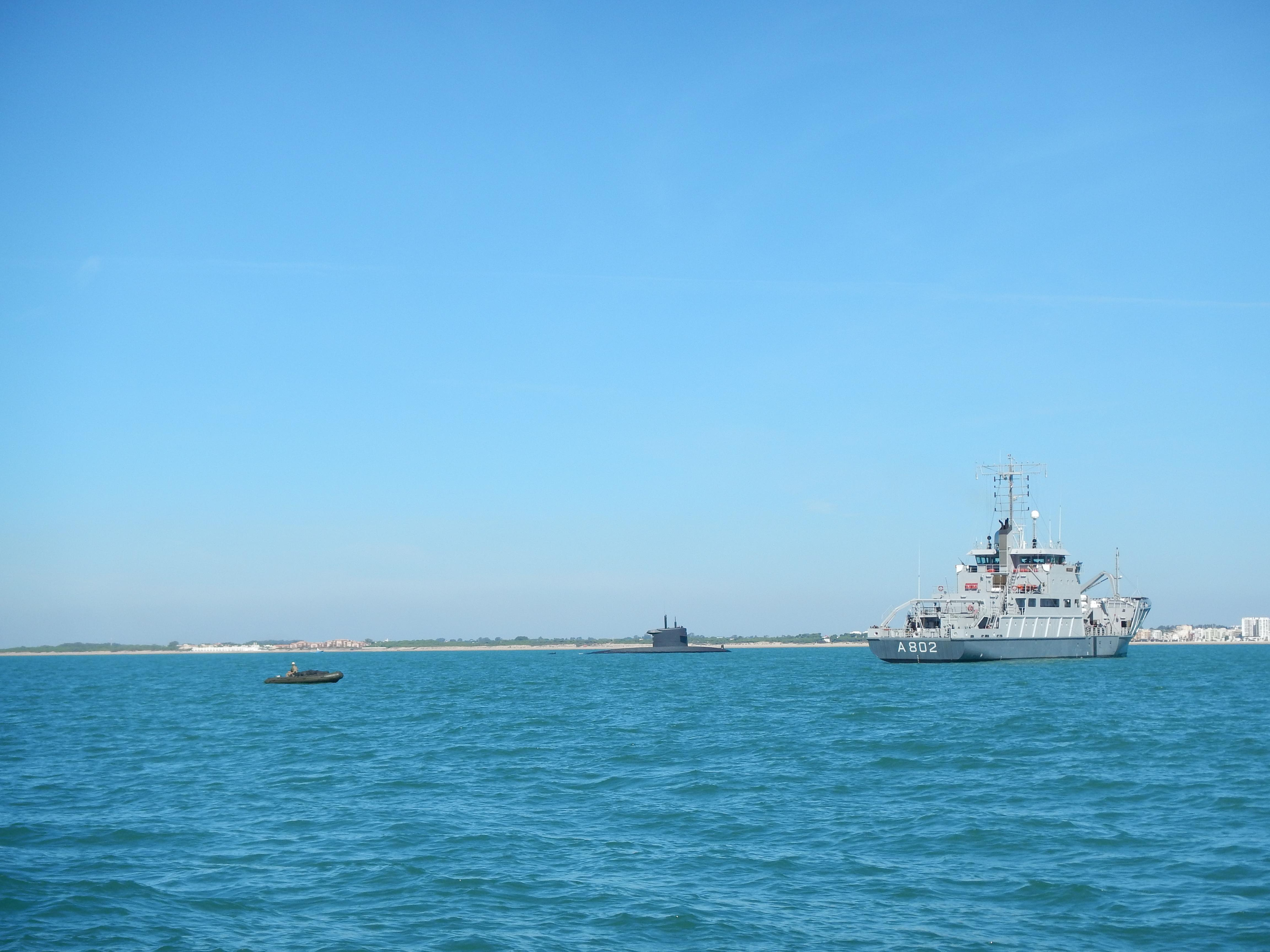
- Interactive map of Gulf of Cádiz
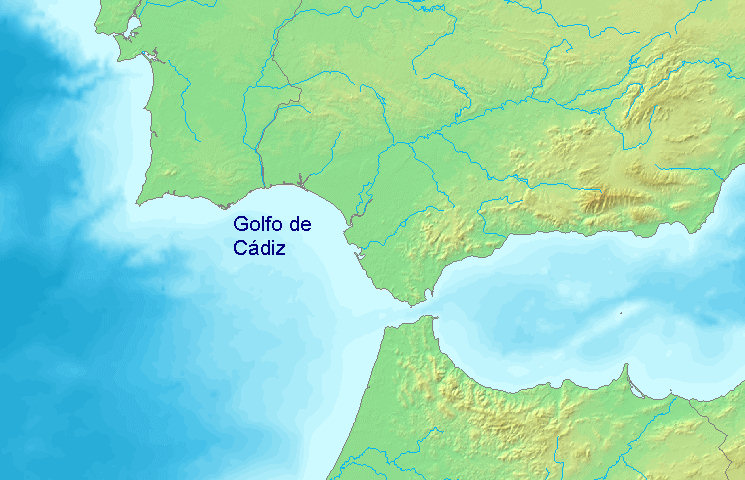
- Map showing the Gulf of Cádiz.
- Location: Atlantic Ocean
- Coordinates: 36°50′N 7°10′W
- Basin countries: Spain and Portugal
- Average depth: 200 to 4,000 m (660 to 13,120 ft)

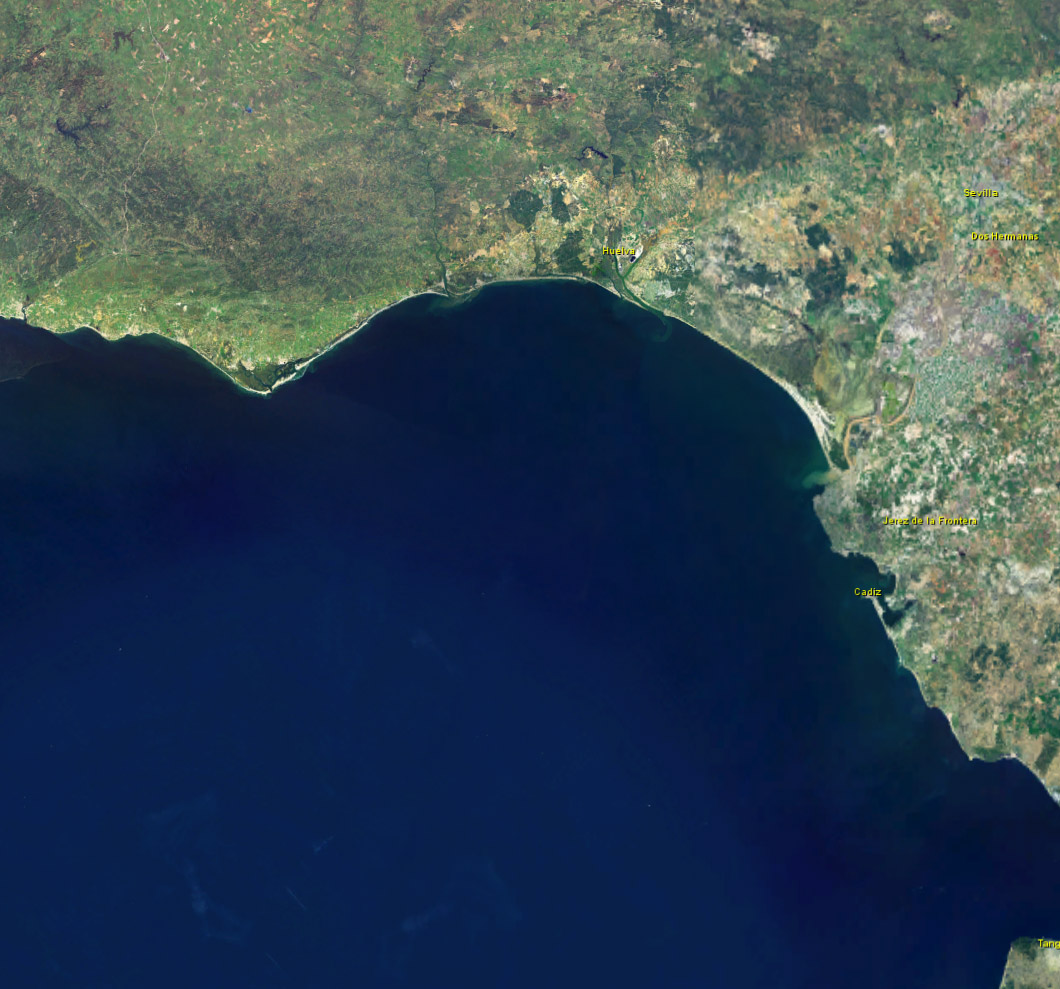
A satellite image of the Gulf of Cádiz.

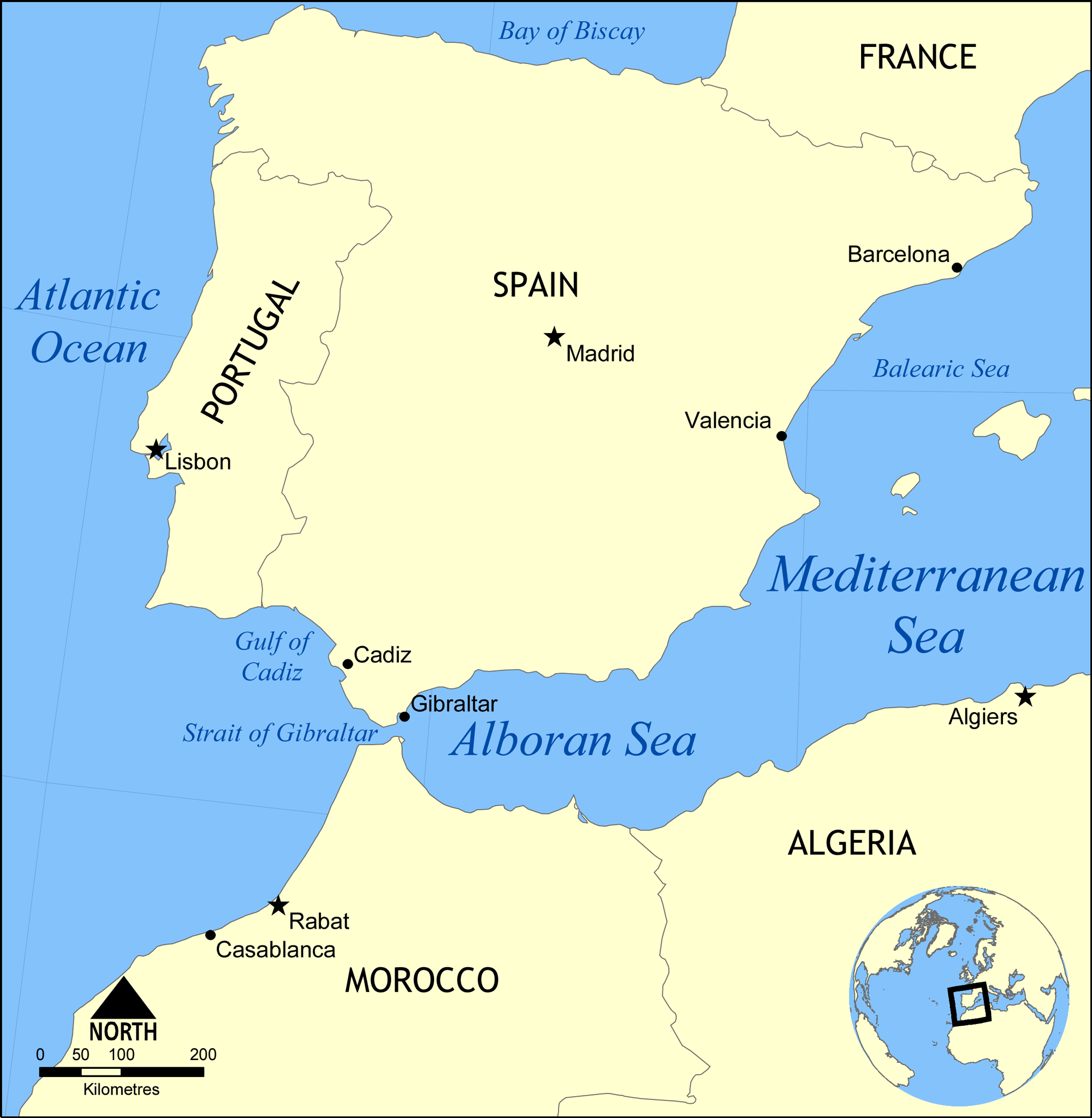
Map showing the Gulf of Cádiz and surrounding area.

The Gulf of Cádiz (Spanish: Golfo de Cádiz, Portuguese: Golfo de Cádis) is the arm of the Atlantic Ocean between Cabo de Santa Maria, the southernmost point of mainland Portugal; and Cape Trafalgar on the Spanish coast at the western end of the Strait of Gibraltar. Two major rivers, the Guadalquivir and the Guadiana, as well as smaller rivers, like the Odiel, the Tinto, and the Guadalete, reach the ocean here.

The Gulf of Cádiz is located in the north-eastern Atlantic Ocean between 34°N and 37°15′N and 6°W to 9°45′W. It is enclosed by the southern Iberian and northern Moroccan margins, west of Strait of Gibraltar.

== Geology ==
The geological history of the Gulf of Cádiz is intimately related to plate tectonic interaction between Southern Eurasia and North Africa and is driven by two major mechanisms:

- subduction associated with the westward emplacement of the Gibraltar Arc and formation of the Gulf of Cádiz accretionary wedge. The current activity of the subduction is unclear, with some advocating ongoing active subduction. Others suggest that subduction is inactive and that a new plate boundary has recently formed along a series of prominent WNW–ESE trending lineaments acting as a dextral strike-slip (transform) plate boundary.
- oblique lithosphere collision between Iberia and Nubia. Oblique convergence between Africa (Nubia) and Iberia (Eurasia) occurs here at about 4 mm (0.16 in) per year in a NW–SE direction. Some have suggested this may also be causing active thrusting in the Gulf of Cádiz.

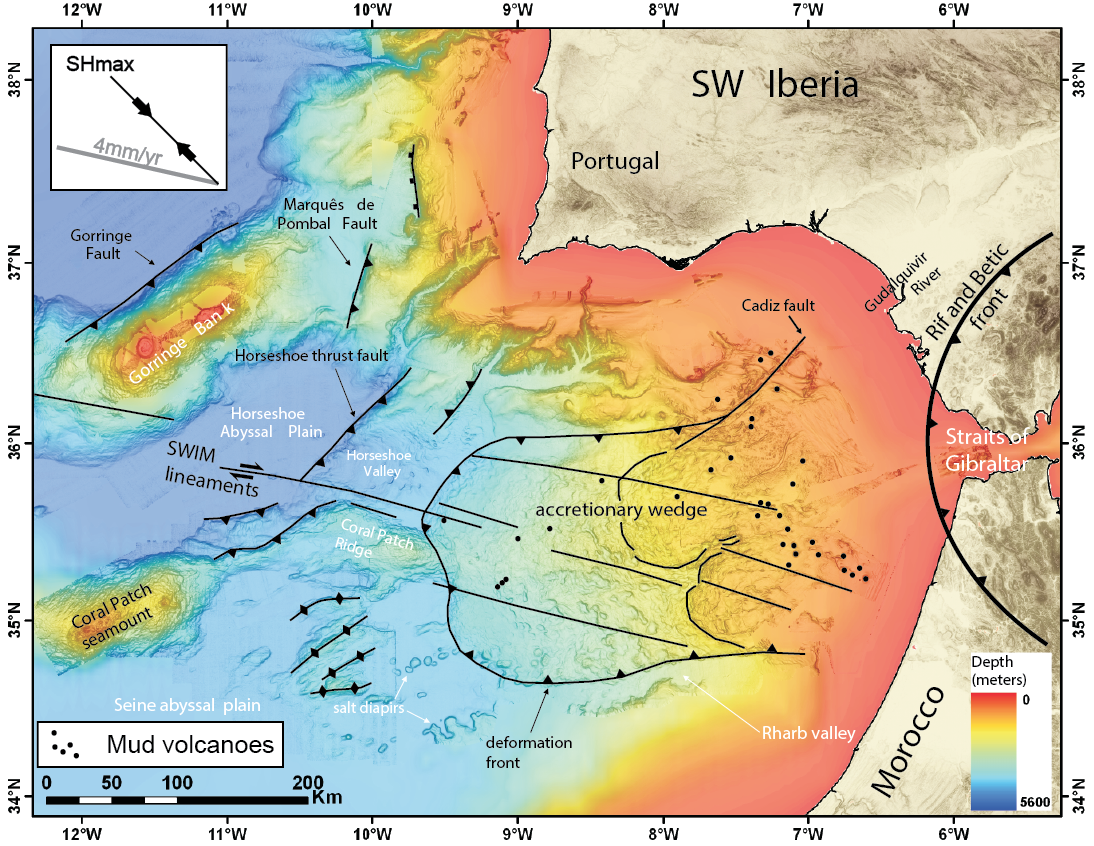
Tectonic map of the Gulf of Cádiz region

It is now well established that the whole area is under compressive deformation and that mud volcanism and processes associated with the escape of hydrocarbon-rich fluids sustain a broad diversity of chemosynthetic assemblages. The accretionary wedge formed by subduction represents an extensive area which encompasses over forty mud volcanoes (a type of cold seep), at depths ranging from 200 to 4,000 m (660 to 13,120 ft) (confirmed by coring), and active methane seepage has been documented on several locations.

== Biota ==
The occurrence of chemosymbiotic biota in the extensive mud volcano fields of the Gulf of Cádiz was first reported in 2003. There were found mainly pogonophoran worms, but also gastropods and bivalves, polychaetes, crustaceans and echinoderms. There were also recorded dead corals of genera Madrepora and Lophelia. The chemosymbiotic bivalves collected from the mud volcanoes of the Gulf of Cádiz were reviewed in 2011. There were reported the following species of chemosymbiotic bivalves of Solemyidae: Acharax gadirae, Solemya elarraichensis; Mytilidae: Bathymodiolus mauritanicus, Idas sp.; Lucinidae: Lucinoma asapheus; Thyasiridae: Thyasira vulcolutre, Spinaxinus sentosus; Vesicomyidae: Isorropodon perplexum, Isorropodon megadesmus, Callogonia cyrili, Christineconcha regab, Laubiericoncha chuni and Pliocardia sp. There is high degree of endemism within chemosymbiotic bivalve assemblages.

== See also ==
- Bay of Cádiz
- Guadalquivir Marshes
