= Phyllomydas scitulus =

Scientific classification
- Kingdom: Animalia
- Phylum: Arthropoda
- Class: Insecta
- Order: Diptera
- Family: Mydidae
- Subfamily: Mydinae
- Tribe: Phyllomydini
- Genus: Phyllomydas
- Species: P. scitulus

Binomial name
- Phyllomydas scitulus (Williston, 1886)

Synonyms
- Mydas scitulus Williston, 1886

Species of fly

Phyllomydas scitulus is a species of mydas fly in the family Mydidae.

== Distribution ==
Mexico.
