= Lamellitrochus inceratus =

Scientific classification
- Kingdom: Animalia
- Phylum: Mollusca
- Class: Gastropoda
- Subclass: Vetigastropoda
- Order: Trochida
- Superfamily: Trochoidea
- Family: Solariellidae
- Genus: Lamellitrochus
- Species: L. inceratus

Binomial name
- Lamellitrochus inceratus Quinn, 1991

Synonyms
- Calliostoma tiara auct. non Watson, 1879; Solariella amabilis auct. non Jeffreys, 1865; Solariella lamellosa auct. non Verrill & Smith, 1880; Zetela inceratus Quinn, 1991

Species of gastropod

Lamellitrochus inceratus is a species of sea snail, a marine gastropod mollusk in the family Solariellidae.

== Distribution ==
This species occurs in the Caribbean Sea, the Gulf of Mexico and the Lesser Antilles.

== Description ==
The maximum recorded shell length is 8.2 mm.

== Habitat ==
Minimum recorded depth is 86 m. Maximum recorded depth is 1472 m.
