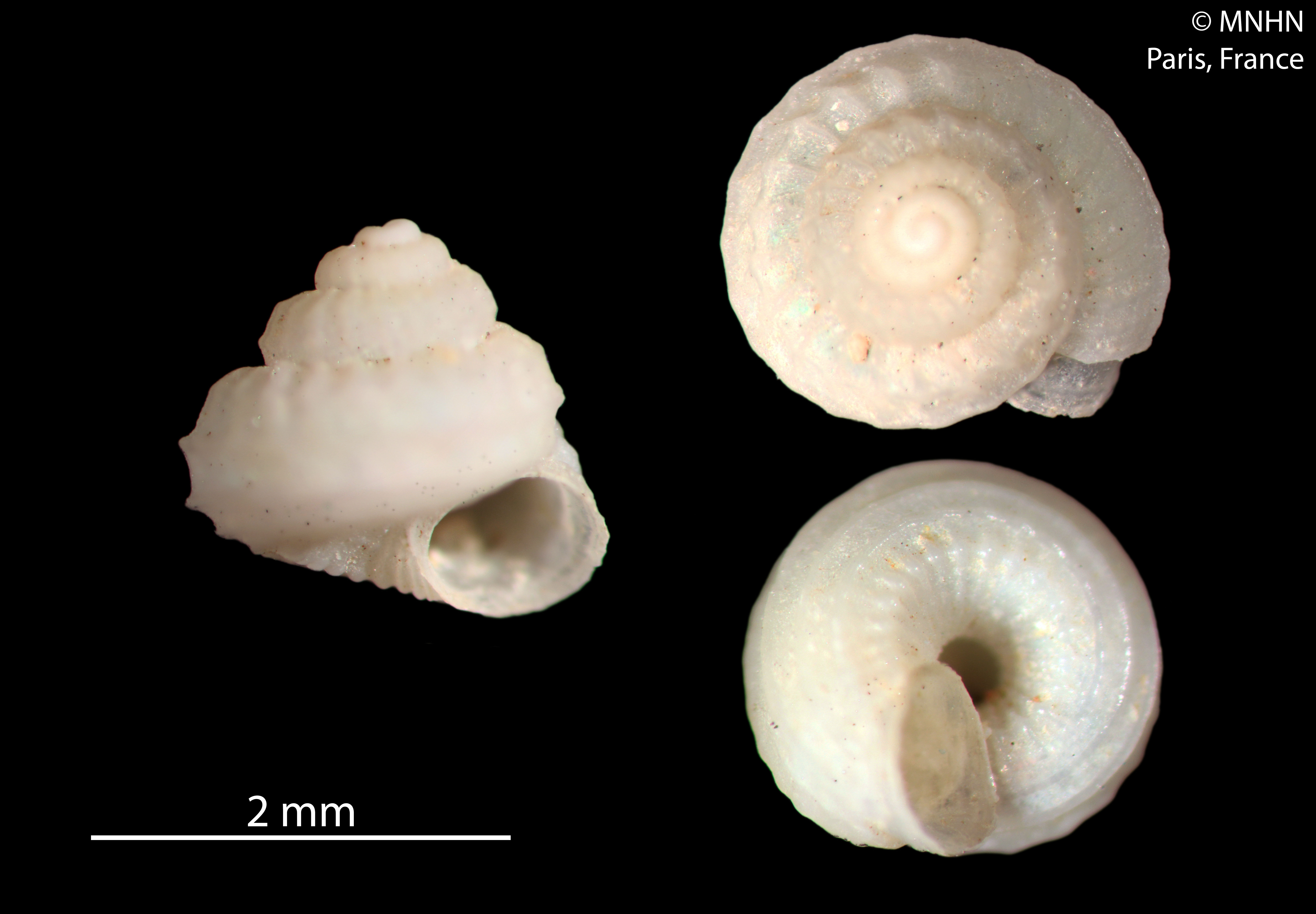
- Shell of Lamellitrochus carinatus (paratype at MNHN, Paris)

Scientific classification
- Kingdom: Animalia
- Phylum: Mollusca
- Class: Gastropoda
- Subclass: Vetigastropoda
- Order: Trochida
- Superfamily: Trochoidea
- Family: Solariellidae
- Genus: Lamellitrochus; Quinn, 1991

Type species
- Margarita lamellosa Verrill & S. Smith [in Verrill], 1880

Species
- See text

Synonyms
- Zetela Finlay, 1926

= Lamellitrochus =

Genus of gastropods

Lamellitrochus is a genus of sea snails, marine gastropod mollusks in the family Solariellidae.

This is a taxon inquirendum: possible synonym of Zetela Finlay, 1926.

== Species ==
Species within the genus Lamellitrochus include:

- Lamellitrochus bicoronatus Quinn, 1991
- Lamellitrochus cancapae (Vilvens & Swinnen, 2007)
- Lamellitrochus carinatus Quinn, 1991
- Lamellitrochus fenestratus Quinn, 1991
- Lamellitrochus filosus Quinn, 1991
- Lamellitrochus inceratus Quinn, 1991
- Lamellitrochus lamellosus (Verrill & S. Smith, 1880)
- Lamellitrochus pourtalesi (Clench & Aguayo, 1939)
- Lamellitrochus suavis Quinn, 1991
