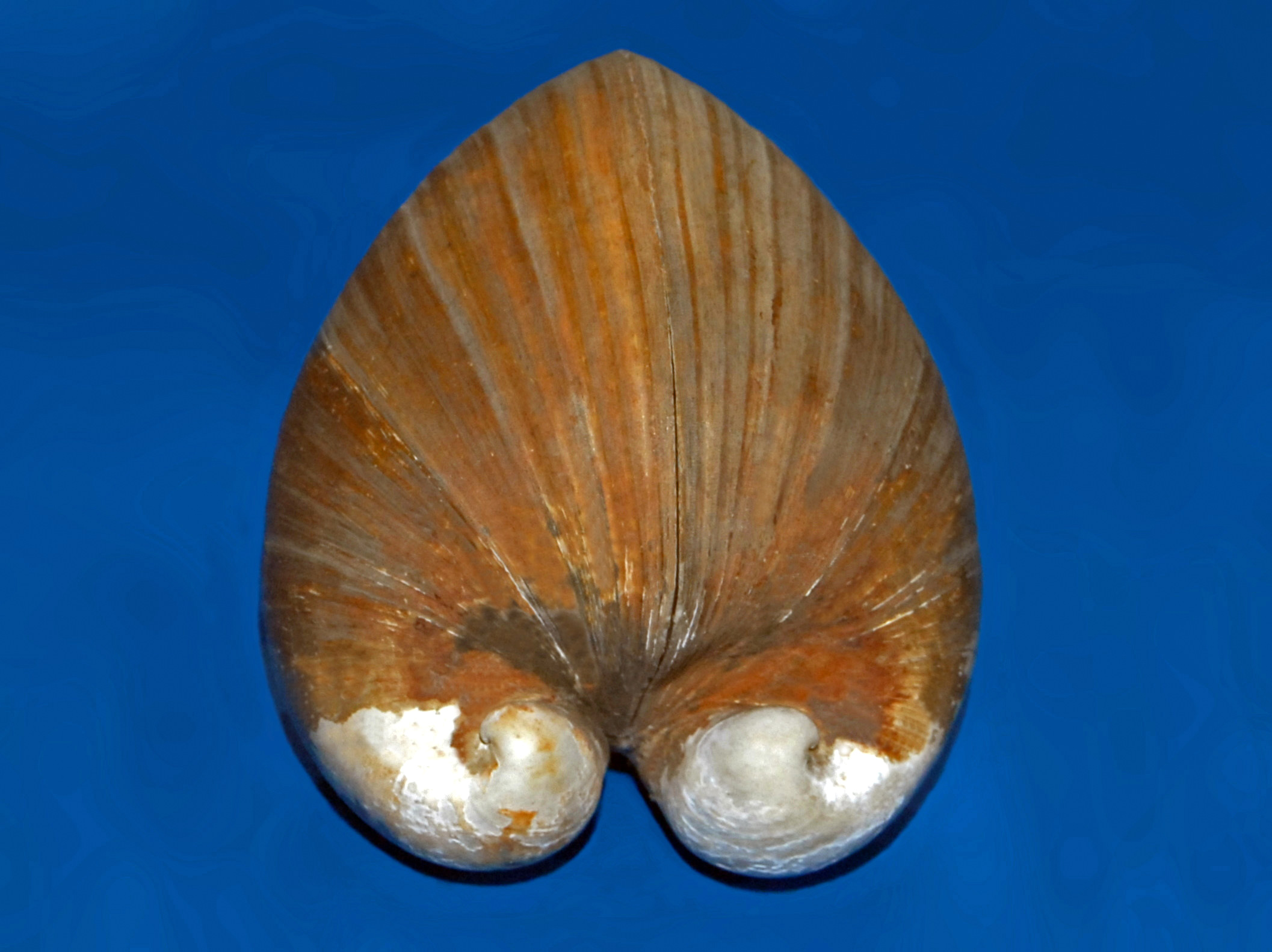
- The shell of Glossus humanus

Scientific classification
- Kingdom: Animalia
- Phylum: Mollusca
- Class: Bivalvia
- Order: Venerida
- Superfamily: Glossoidea
- Family: Glossidae
- Genus: Glossus (Poli, 1801)

Species
- See text.

Synonyms
- Isocardia Lamarck, 1799; Buccardium Megerle von Mühlfeld, 1811; Bucardia Schumacher, 1817; Bucardium Agassiz, 1848

= Glossus (bivalve) =

Glossus Temporal range: Cretaceous–Holocene

Genus of bivalves

Glossus is a genus of marine bivalve molluscs in the family Glossidae. Only one species, the oxheart clam (G. humanus), is still extant, living in flat, muddy regions deep off the North Atlantic coastline of Europe.

== Fossil records ==
All species of this genus, including the remaining extant species, G. humanus, are found in the fossil record from the Cretaceous to the Pliocene (age range: from 99.7 to 2.588 million years ago). Fossils are found in the marine strata of eastern North America, Eurasia and the Indo-Pacific.

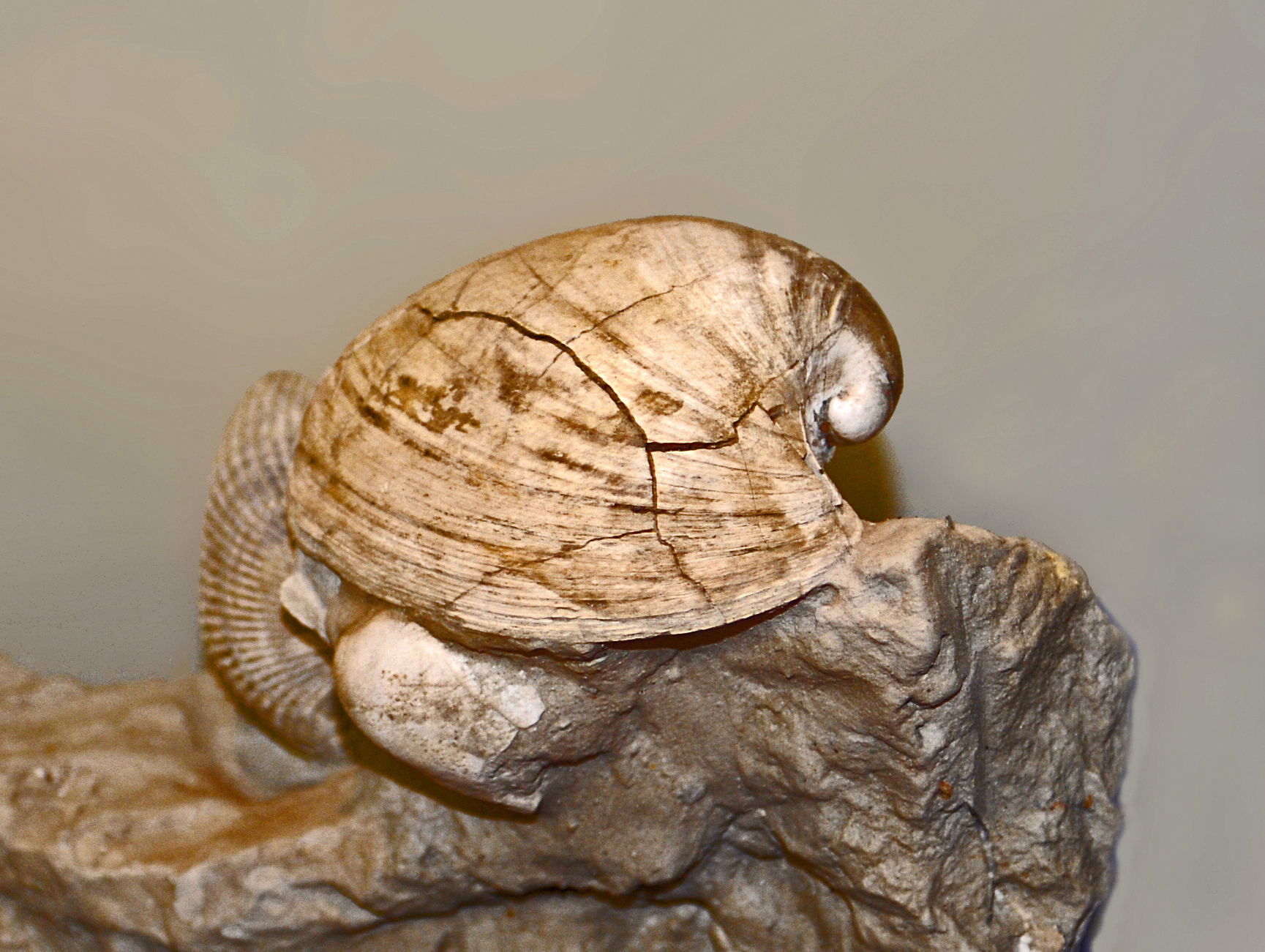
Fossil shell of Glossus humanus from Pliocene of Italy

== Species ==
The following species are recognised in the genus Glossus:

- †Glossus abichianus (Romanovsky, 1890)
- †Glossus eichwaldianus (Romanovsky, 1890)
- †Glossus gigantaeus (Ovechkin, 1954)
- Glossus humanus (Linnaeus, 1758)
- †Glossus lunulatus (Nyst, 1835)
- †Glossus major (Hölzl, 1958)
- †Glossus neocomiensis (Agassiz, 1842)
- †Glossus olearii (O. Semper, 1861)
- †Glossus subtransversus (A. d'Orbigny, 1852)

== Bibliography ==
- G. Owen - On The Biology Of Glossus Humanus (L.) (Isocardia Cor Lam.) Journal of the Marine Biological Association of the United Kingdom
- Huber M. (2010) Compendium of bivalves. A full-color guide to 3,300 of the world's marine bivalves. A status on Bivalvia after 250 years of research. Hackenheim: ConchBooks. 901 pp., 1
- Guido Poppe und Yoshihiro Goto: European Seashells Volume 2 (Scaphopoda, Bivalvia, Cephalopoda). 221 S., Verlag Christa Hemmen, Wiesbaden 1993 (2000 unv. Nachdruck) ISBN 3-925919-10-4
