= Phyllomydas weemsi =

Scientific classification
- Kingdom: Animalia
- Phylum: Arthropoda
- Class: Insecta
- Order: Diptera
- Family: Mydidae
- Subfamily: Mydinae
- Tribe: Phyllomydini
- Genus: Phyllomydas
- Species: P. weemsi

Binomial name
- Phyllomydas weemsi Wilcox, 1978

Species of fly

Phyllomydas weemsi is a species of Mydas fly in the family Mydidae.

== Distribution ==
Florida.
