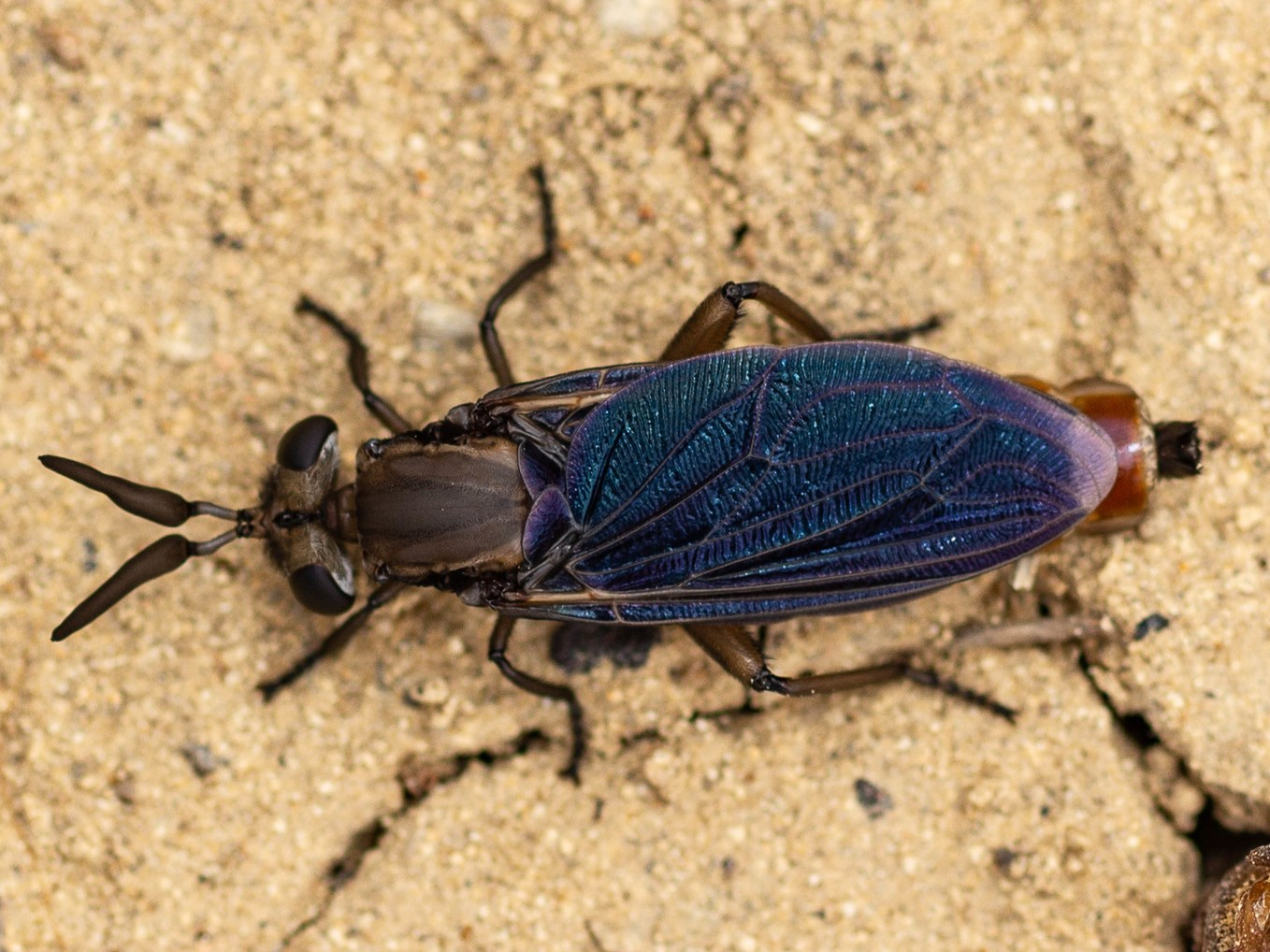

Scientific classification
- Kingdom: Animalia
- Phylum: Arthropoda
- Class: Insecta
- Order: Diptera
- Family: Mydidae
- Subfamily: Mydinae
- Tribe: Phyllomydini
- Genus: Phyllomydas
- Species: P. phyllocerus

Binomial name
- Phyllomydas phyllocerus Bigot, 1880

= Phyllomydas phyllocerus =

Species of fly

Phyllomydas phyllocerus is a species of mydas fly in the family Mydidae.

== Distribution ==
United States.
