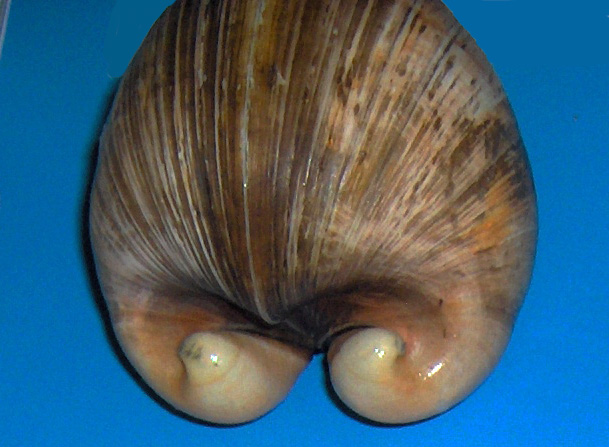
- A view of the umbonal area of Glossus humanus, the oxheart clam

Scientific classification
- Kingdom: Animalia
- Phylum: Mollusca
- Class: Bivalvia
- Order: Venerida
- Superfamily: Glossoidea
- Family: Glossidae; Gray, 1847

Genera
- See text

Synonyms
- Isocardiidae J. E. Gray, 1840

= Glossidae =

Family of bivalves

Glossidae is a family of saltwater clams in the superfamily Glossoidea.

== Taxonomy ==
The following genera and species are recognised in the family Glossidae:

- †Fissilunula Etheridge, 1902
  - †Fissilunula clarkei (C. Moore, 1870)
  - †Fissilunula coreenaensis Day, 2025
- Glossus
  - †Glossus abichianus (Romanovsky, 1890)
  - †Glossus eichwaldianus (Romanovsky, 1890)
  - †Glossus gigantaeus (Ovechkin, 1954)
  - Glossus humanus Linnaeus, 1758 – oxheart clam
  - †Glossus lunulatus (Nyst, 1835)
  - †Glossus major (Hölzl, 1958)
  - †Glossus neocomiensis (Agassiz, 1842)
  - †Glossus olearii (O. Semper, 1861)
  - †Glossus subtransversus (A. d'Orbigny, 1852)
- Meiocardia H. and A. Adams, 1857
  - Meiocardia cumingi (A. Adams, 1864)
  - †Meiocardia faxensis (Lundgren, 1867)
  - †Meiocardia floridana (Dall, 1900)
  - Meiocardia hawaiana Dall, Bartsch & Rehder, 1938
  - †Meiocardia incognita Zubkovitsch, 1961
  - Meiocardia moltkiana (Gmelin, 1791)
  - †Meiocardia palmerae Nicol, 1968
  - Meiocardia samarangiae F. R. Bernard, Y. Cai & B. Morton, 1993
  - Meiocardia sanguineomaculata (Dunker, 1882)
  - †Meiocardia septemcostata Wanner & Hahn, 1935
  - †Meiocardia subcumingii (H. Woodward, 1879)
  - †Meiocardia susukii (Squires & Advocate, 1986)
  - Meiocardia vulgaris (Reeve, 1845)
- †Miocardiopsis Glibert, 1936
  - †Miocardiopsis carinata (Deshayes, 1829)
  - †Miocardiopsis chonioides (Cossmann, 1886)
  - †Miocardiopsis eocaenica (Bayan, 1873)
  - †Miocardiopsis isocardioides (Deshayes, 1858)
  - †Miocardiopsis laciniosa (Staadt, 1913)
  - †Miocardiopsis loustaui (Cossmann, 1886)
  - †Miocardiopsis subquadrata (Cossmann, 1886)
  - †Miocardiopsis tapina (Cossmann, 1886)
- †Petalocardia É. Vincent, 1925
  - †Petalocardia pectinifera (J. De C. Sowerby, 1823)
