= Lamellitrochus fenestratus =

Scientific classification
- Kingdom: Animalia
- Phylum: Mollusca
- Class: Gastropoda
- Subclass: Vetigastropoda
- Order: Trochida
- Superfamily: Trochoidea
- Family: Solariellidae
- Genus: Lamellitrochus
- Species: L. fenestratus

Binomial name
- Lamellitrochus fenestratus Quinn, 1991

Species of gastropod

Lamellitrochus fenestratus is a species of sea snail, a marine gastropod mollusk in the family Solariellidae.

== Description ==
The length of the shell attains 3.4 mm.

== Distribution ==
This marine species occurs in the Lesser Antilles off Barbados at depths between 183 m and 229 m.
