= Lamellitrochus cancapae =

Scientific classification
- Kingdom: Animalia
- Phylum: Mollusca
- Class: Gastropoda
- Subclass: Vetigastropoda
- Order: Trochida
- Superfamily: Trochoidea
- Family: Solariellidae
- Genus: Lamellitrochus
- Species: L. cancapae

Binomial name
- Lamellitrochus cancapae (Vilvens & Swinnen, 2007)

Synonyms
- Solariella cancapae Vilvens & Swinnen, 2007

Species of gastropod

Lamellitrochus cancapae is a species of sea snail, a marine gastropod mollusk in the family Solariellidae. The size of the shell attains 10 mm. This species occurs in the Atlantic Ocean off the Azores.
