= Peninsula least gecko =

Conservation status
- Near Threatened (IUCN 3.1)

Scientific classification
- Kingdom: Animalia
- Phylum: Chordata
- Class: Reptilia
- Order: Squamata
- Suborder: Gekkota
- Family: Sphaerodactylidae
- Genus: Sphaerodactylus
- Species: S. clenchi

Binomial name
- Sphaerodactylus clenchi Shreve, 1968

Species of lizard

The peninsula least gecko (Sphaerodactylus clenchi) is a species of lizard in the family Sphaerodactylidae. The species is endemic to the Dominican Republic.

== Etymology ==
The specific name, clenchi, is in honor of American malacologist William James "Bill" Clench, who collected the holotype.

== Habitat ==
The preferred natural habitat of S. clenchi is forest, at elevations from sea level to 305 m (1,001 ft).

== Reproduction ==
S. clenchi is oviparous.

== Subspecies ==
Two subspecies are recognized as being valid, including the nominotypical subspecies.

- Sphaerodactylus clenchi apocoptus Schwartz, 1983
- Sphaerodactylus clenchi clench Shreve, 1968
