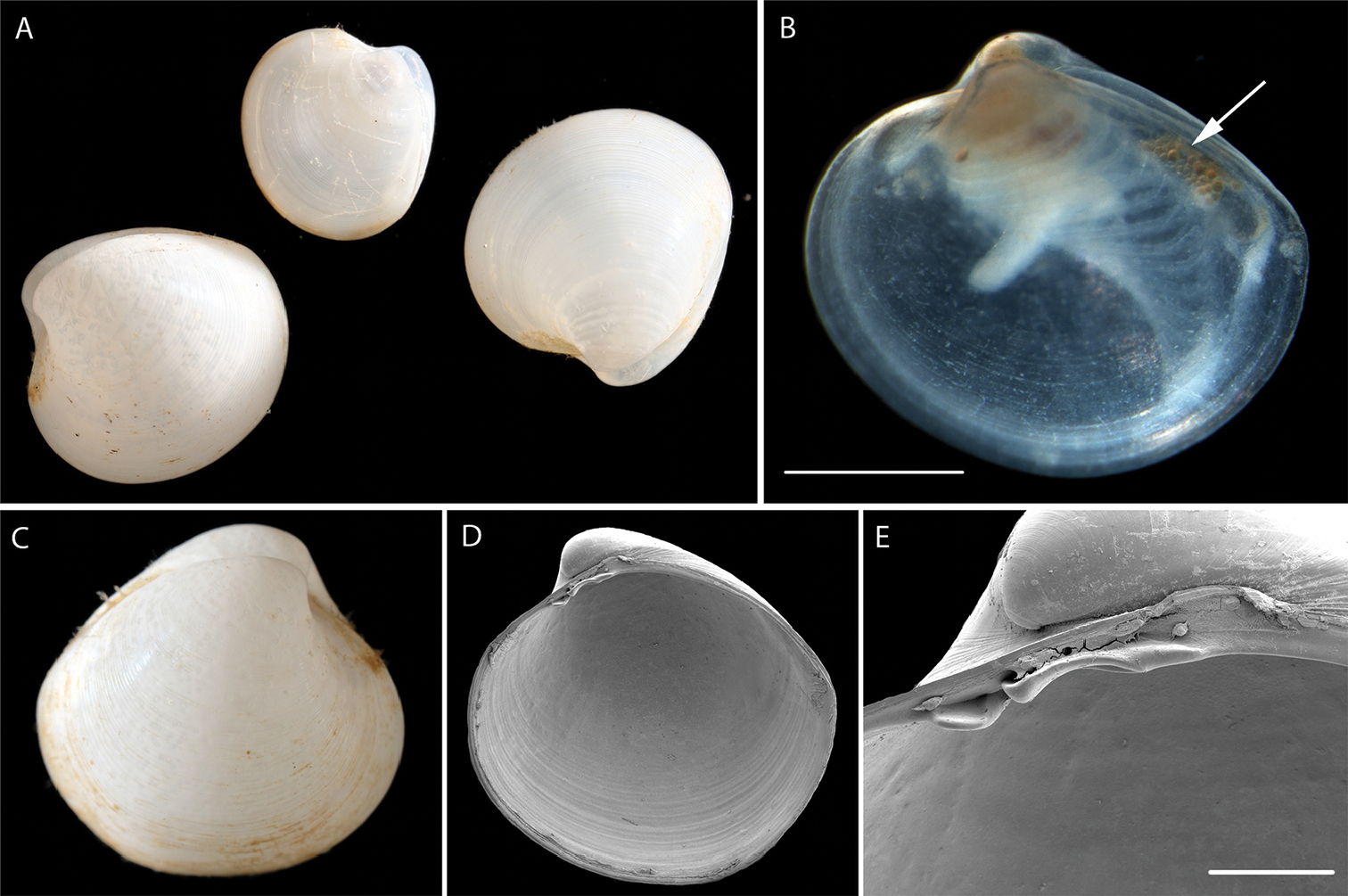
- Vesicomya galatheae

Scientific classification
- Kingdom: Animalia
- Phylum: Mollusca
- Class: Bivalvia
- Superorder: Imparidentia
- Order: Venerida
- Superfamily: Glossoidea
- Family: Vesicomyidae; Dall & Simpson, 1901

= Vesicomyidae =

Family of bivalve molluscs

Vesicomyidae is a family of saltwater clams, marine bivalve molluscs in the superfamily Glossoidea. They thrive in communities of sulphide-rich reducing environments, at depths from 100 to 9050 m.

Vesicomyidae is very often studied to understand molecular adaptation to extreme deep-sea environments and biogeography. Studies of Kenzoic fossile figures show that Vesicomyidae has lived in this type of habitat since late Eocene, 42-47 millions of years ago. The taxonomy foor this family is currently under revision as there is a discrepancy between molecular data and morphological data.

Swedish researcher Frida Hybertsen has shown in her dissertation that the difference in size of the Vesicomyidae between Eocene to the Oligocene might be due to climate change.

Vesicomyidae has been found at the underwater Piip Volcano in the Bering Sea, off the Puerto Rican coast and more recently in the Ross Sea.

== Genera and species ==
Genera, and some selected species, within the family Vesicomyidae are:

Subfamily Pliocardiinae Woodring, 1925

- Abyssogena Krylova, Sahling & R. Janssen, 2010
- Archivesica Dall, 1908
- Austrogena Krylova, Sellanes, F. Valdés & D'Elía, 2014
- Callogonia Dall, 1889
- Calyptogena Dall, 1891
  - Calyptogena magnifica
  - Calyptogena pacifica Dall, 1891
- Christineconcha Krylova & Cosel, 2011
- † Cytherocardia Sacco, 1900
- Ectenagena Woodring, 1938
- Elenaconcha Cosel & Olu, 2009
- † Hubertschenckia Takeda, 1953
- Isorropodon Sturany, 1896
- Laubiericoncha von Cosel & Olu, 2008
  - Laubiericoncha angulata (Dall, 1896) (formerly in Vesicomya)
  - Laubiericoncha chuni (Thiele & Jaeckel, 1931) (formerly in Vesicomya)
  - Laubiericoncha myriamae von Cosel & Olu, 2008
  - Laubiericoncha suavis (Dall, 1913) (formerly in Vesicomya)
  - Laubiericoncha sp. 'Edison Seamount'
  - Laubiericoncha sp. 'Gakkel Ridge'
- † Notocalyptogena Amano, Saether, C. Little & K.A. Campbell, 2014
- Phreagena Woodring, 1938
- Pleurophopsis Van Winkle, 1919 (fossil, nomen dubium, sometimes included in Calyptogena)
  - "Pleurophopsis" peruviana Olsson, 1931 (fossil)
  - "Pleurophopsis" unioides Van Winkle, 1919 (fossil)
- Pliocardia Woodring, 1925
- Turneroconcha Krylova & Sahling, 2020
- Waisiuconcha Beets, 1942
- Wareniconcha Cosel & Olu, 2009

Subfamily Vesicomyinae Dall & Simpson, 1901

- Vesicomya Dall, 1886
  - Vesicomya atlantica (E. A. Smith, 1885)
  - Vesicomya bruuni Filatova, 1969
  - Vesicomya caribbea Boss, 1967
  - Vesicomya cordata Boss, 1968
  - Vesicomya gigas (Dall, 1896)
  - Vesicomya leeana (Dall, 1889)
  - Vesicomya lepta (Dall, 1896)
  - Vesicomya ovalis (Dall, 1896)
  - Vesicomya pilula (Dall, 1881)
  - Vesicomya smithii Dall, 1889
  - Vesicomya stearnsii (Dall, 1895)
  - Vesicomya vesica (Dall, 1886)

Synonyms

- † Adulomya Kuroda, 1931 (includes Ectenagenasynonym of Pleurophopsis)
  - † Adulomya elongata (Dall, 1916)
  - † Adulomya extenta (Krylova & Moskalev, 1996)
  - † Adulomya phaseoliformis (Métivier, Okutani & Ohta, 1986)
  - † Adulomya kaikoi (Okutani & Métivier, 1986)
  - † Adulomya uchimuraensis Kuroda, 1931 : synonym of † Pleurophopsis uchimuraensis (Kuroda, 1931) (original combination)
- Akebiconcha Kuroda, 1943: synonym of Archivesica Dall, 1908
- Laubiericoncha Cosel & Olu, 2008: synonym of Archivesica Dall, 1908
- Pleurophoropsis Cossmann, 1920: synonym of Pleurophopsis van Winkle, 1919 (unjustified emendation of Pleurophopsis)
