= William F. Clapp =

Zoologist

William Frederick Clapp (1880–1951) was a specialist in mollusks at Harvard University's Museum of Comparative Zoology and one of the people who influenced William J. Clench to go into the study of mollusks.

From 1911 to 1923, Clapp was curator of the MCZ's mollusk collection. In the later year he went to the Massachusetts Institute of Technology where he conducted research on the Teredinidae. He also later established his own laboratory in Duxbury, Massachusetts to try to develop methods to control these mollusks which often are destructive to ships.

== Sources ==
- entry in a listing of New England Naturalists
- note from Harvard on Clapp's death
