= Johnsonia (journal) =

- Discipline: Zoology, Malacology
- Language: English
- Edited by: William J. Clench

Publication details
- History: 1941-1975
- Publisher: Museum of Comparative Zoology (USA)
- Open access: No

Standard abbreviations
- ISO 4: Johnsonia

Indexing
- ISSN: 0075-3920
- OCLC no.: 1607451

Links
- BHL Online archive

Johnsonia was a scientific journal published by the Museum of Comparative Zoology at Harvard University from 1941 to 1975. It was established by William J. Clench who named it after Charles Willison Johnson, who had been one of the men who convinced Clench to pursue the study of molluscs. It was primarily focused on the study of molluscs in the Western Atlantic, containing book reviews, guides on where to find various molluscs, drawings of and descriptions of molluscs, and related items.
