= Charles Willison Johnson =

American entomologist (1863–1932)

Charles W. Johnson
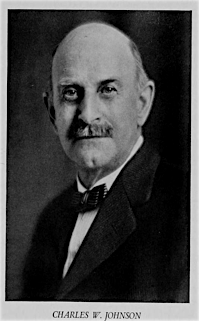
- Charles W. Johnson
- Born: October 26, 1863; Morris Plains, New Jersey
- Died: July 19, 1932 (aged 68); Brookline, Massachusetts
- Scientific career
- Fields: entomology, malacology
- Institutions: Wagner Free Institute; Academy of Natural Sciences; Boston Society of Natural History

Charles Willison Johnson (October 26, 1863 – July 19, 1932) was an American naturalist who specialized in entomology (especially Diptera) and malacology, making significant contributions in both fields. He was a mentor and inspiration to many students and young scientists such as William J. Clench (who founded a publication named Johnsonia in his honor). Johnson was Curator of the Wagner Free Institute of Science, 1888–1903, then was Principal Curator at the Boston Society of Natural History, 1903–1932.

He assisted Henry Augustus Pilsbry with The Nautilus, an important American malacological publication. Although both were credited on the title page as "Editors and Publishers", Johnson was the business manager and Pilsbry was the editor, with Johnson acting as editor when Pilsbry was on extended field expeditions.

== Biography ==
Charles Johnson was born to Albert Fletcher Johnson and Sarah Willison Johnson in Morris Plains, New Jersey. He attended public and private schools at Morristown, New Jersey. At age 17 he moved to St. Augustine, Florida, and threw himself into an intensive and energetic study of the area's fauna. His activity caught the eye of Joseph Willcox, a trustee of the Wagner Free Institute of Philadelphia, who was in Florida on a field trip. Willcox invited Johnson to become the Wagner's curator, so in 1888 Johnson moved to Philadelphia, Pennsylvania and took up that post. During his fourteen-year tenure, he greatly improved and modernized the Institute's collections. He also was asked to curate two special collections of the Academy of Natural Sciences in Philadelphia.

In 1903 he accepted the post of chief curator at the Boston Society of Natural History at the passing of the previous curator (Professor Alpheus Hyatt). He remained at that position until his death at age 68, in Brookline, Massachusetts.

On January 14, 1897, he married Carrie W. Ford in Philadelphia. Her father was a prominent Philadelphia personality, known for his extensive collection of shells. They had no children; she died July 16, 1931, at Brookline.

His co-workers estimated that during his lifetime, Johnson had published at least 130 articles on the topic of entomology, and at least 100 articles on molluscan subjects.

== Sources ==
- The Nautilus, 1963 Johnson's entry in the Author Index.
- Psyche 39 (1932) The Entomological Publications of C. W. Johnson
- The Nautilus, 1933 (pp. 129-134) Obituary
- The Boston Society of Natural History 1830-1930 Centennial history of the Society (Johnson's portrait is on p. 91)
