= Ruth Turner =

American marine biologist

Ruth Dixon Turner
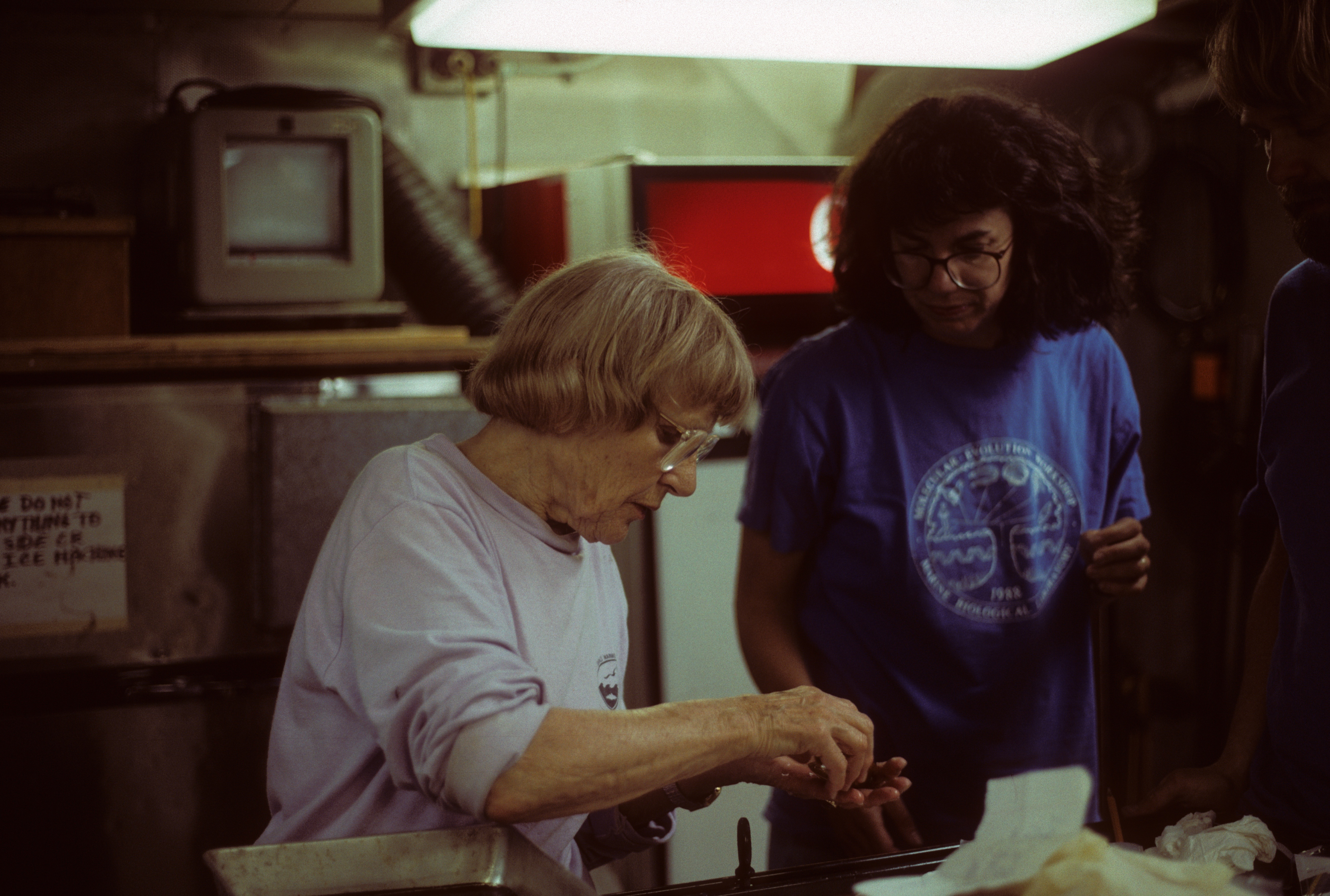
- Ruth Turner and Colleen Cavanaugh dissecting clams from the deep sea
- Born: December 7, 1914; Melrose, Massachusetts, U.S.
- Died: April 30, 2000 (aged 85); Waltham, Massachusetts, U.S.
- Education: Harvard University
- Scientific career
- Fields: Malacology
- Workplaces: Museum of Comparative Zoology

Ruth Dixon Turner (1914 – April 30, 2000) was a pioneering U.S. marine biologist and malacologist. She was the world's expert on Teredinidae or shipworms, a taxonomic family of wood-boring bivalve mollusks which severely damage wooden marine installations.

Turner held the Alexander Agassiz Professorship at Harvard University, and was a Curator of Malacology in the university's Museum of Comparative Zoology, where she also served as co-editor of the scientific journal Johnsonia. She graduated from Bridgewater State College, earned a master's degree at Cornell University and a Ph.D. at Harvard (Radcliffe College) where she specialized in shipworm research.

Turner became one of Harvard's first tenured women professors in 1973, and was one of the most academically successful female marine researchers, publishing over 200 scientific articles and a book during her long career. She was also the first female scientist to use the deep ocean research submarine Alvin. Much of Turner's work was done in co-operation with William J. Clench. Among other things they jointly described about 70 new mollusk species.

Organisms named in honor of Turner include two symbiotic bacteria associated with bivalves: Teredinibacter turnerae (isolated from the shipworm Lyrodus pedicellatus), and Candidatus Ruthia magnifica (from the deep-sea bivalve Calyptogena magnifica).
