= Glossoidea =

Scientific classification
- Kingdom: Animalia
- Phylum: Mollusca
- Class: Bivalvia
- Order: Venerida
- Superfamily: Glossoidea; J. E. Gray, 1847 (1840)

Superfamily of molluscs

Glossoidea is a superfamily of molluscs.

== Etymology ==
The name is derived from the Greek γλῶσσα, "glossa", meaning language or tongue, and "-oidea," a suffix denoting a superfamily.

== Taxonomy ==
Glossoidea contains the following families:

- Vesicomyidae
- Kelliellidae
- Glossidae
