= William J. Clench =

American malacologist

William James Clench
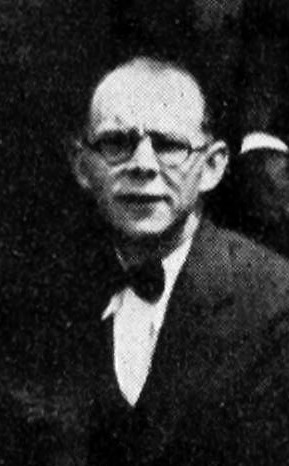
- William James Clench in 1931
- Born: 24 October 1897; Brooklyn
- Died: 22 February 1984 (aged 86)
- Education: University of Michigan; Harvard University
- Spouse: Julia Helmich (m. 1924)
- Scientific career
- Fields: Malacology
- Workplaces: Museum of Comparative Zoology
- Academic advisors: William Morton Wheeler

William James Clench (24 October 1897 – 22 February 1984) was an American malacologist, professor at Harvard University and curator of the mollusk collection in the malacology department of the Museum of Comparative Zoology at Harvard.

== Early life ==
Clench was born in Brooklyn, but was largely raised in Massachusetts.

In 1913, he entered the Huntington School in Boston. While he was there, he often engaged in bug collecting, and would show his collections to Charles Willison Johnson at the Boston Society of Natural History.

Johnson introduced Clench to such men as William F. Clapp, who was the curator of mollusks at the Museum of Comparative Zoology (MCZ).

== Education ==
Clench received his undergraduate education at Michigan State College (now Michigan State University), graduating in 1921. He spent the summer studying mollusks on Sanibel Island and then began study at Harvard under William Morton Wheeler.

He received his master's degree in entomology in 1923.

He then went on to pursue his PhD at the University of Michigan, in Ann Arbor, in mollusk study, with a Hinsdale Fellowship. He finished his PhD work in 1953.

== Personal life ==
In 1924, Clench married Julia Helmich, a resident of East Lansing, Michigan whom he met while attending Michigan Agricultural College.

Their eldest son, Harry Kendon Clench (1925–1979), would become a well-known lepidopterist at the Carnegie Museum of Natural History in Pittsburgh. Their younger son, Carleton William Clench (1927–2016) was a physicist in the aerospace industry.

He died in February 22, 1984 at age 86.

== Career ==
Clench left Ann Arbor in 1925, to take a position at the Kent Scientific Museum. In 1926, he joined the Museum of Comparative Zoology, where he remained until 1966.

Much of Clench's work was done with Ruth D. Turner. Jointly they introduced about 70 new taxa, and the two of them (together and independently) introduced a total of approximately 500 new taxa.

== Species that are named after in honor ==
A species of lizard, Sphaerodactylus clenchi, is named in honor of William J. Clench.

== Bibliography ==
Clench published over 400 scientific papers, and was the founding editor of Johnsonia. He also served as the third president of the American Malacological Union.

Bibliography:

- Clench, W. J. 1937. Onchidium (Onchidella) floridanum Dall. The Nautilus 50(3): 85–86.
- Clench, W. J. 1942a. The genus Ficus in the Western Atlantic. Johnsonia 1(2): 1–2.
- Clench, W. J. 1942b. The genus Conus in the Western Atlantic. Johnsonia 1(6): 1–40.
- Clench, W. J. 1944. The genera Casmaria, Galeodea, Phalium and Cassis in the Western Atlantic. Johnsonia 1(16): 1–16.
- Clench, W. J. 1946. The genera Bathyaurinia, Rehderia and Scaphella in the Western Atlantic. Johnsonia 2(22): 41–60.
- Clench, W. J. 1947. The genera Purpura and Thais in the Western Atlantic. Johnsonia 2(23): 61–91.
- Clench, W. J. 1953a. The genus Conus in the Western Atlantic. Johnsonia 2(32): 362–376.
- Clench, W. J. 1953b. The genera Scaphella and Aurinopsis in the Western Atlantic. Johnsonia 2(32): 376–380.
- Clench, W. J. 1955. A new Murex from Matanzas, Cuba. Breviora 44: 1–3.
- Clench, W. J., and R. T. Abbott. 1941. The genus Strombus in the Western Atlantic. Johnsonia 1(1): 1–15.
- Clench, W. J., and R. T. Abbott. 1942. The genera Tectarius and Echininus in the Western Atlantic. Johnsonia 1(4): 1–4.
- Clench, W. J., and R. T. Abbott. 1943a. The genera Cypraecassis, Morum, Sconsia and Dalium in the Western Atlantic. Johnsonia 1(9): 1–8.
- Clench, W. J., and R. T. Abbott. 1943b. The genera Gaza and Livona in the Western Atlantic. Johnsonia 1(12): 1–9.
- Clench, W. J., and C. G. Aguayo. 1938. Notes and descriptions of new species of Calliostoma, Gaza and Columbarium (Mollusca); obtained by the Harvard-Habana Expedition off the coast of Cuba. Memorias de la Sociedad Cubana de Historia Natural "Felipe Poey" 12(5): 375–384, pl. 28.
- Clench, W. J., and C. G. Aguayo. 1939a. Notas sobre las onchidellas de Cuba. Memorias de la Sociedad Cubana de Historia Natural "Felipe Poey" 13(1): 5–7. (in Spanish).
- Clench, W. J., and C. G. Aguayo. 1939b. Notes and descriptions of new deep-water Mollusca obtained by the Harvard-Havana Expedition off the coast of Cuba. II. Memorias de la Sociedad Cubana de Historia Natural "Felipe Poey" 13(3): 189–197, pls. 28–29.
- Clench, W. J., and C. G. Aguayo. 1940. Notes and descriptions of new deep-water Mollusca obtained by the Harvard-Habana Expedition off Cuba. III. Memorias de la Sociedad Cubana de Historia Natural "Felipe Poey" 14(1): 77–94, pls. 14–16.
- Clench, W. J., and C. G. Aguayo. 1941. Notes and descriptions of new deep-water Mollusca obtained by the Harvard-Havana Expedition off Cuba. IV. Memorias de la Sociedad Cubana de Historia Natural "Felipe Poey" 15(2): 177–180, pl. 14.
- Clench, W. J., and C. G. Aguayo. 1944. A new tropical Buccinum from Cuba. Revista de la Sociedad Malacológica "Carlos de la Torre" 2(2): 67–68.
- Clench, W. J., and C. G. Aguayo. 1946. Notes and descriptions of two new species of Calliostoma from Cuba. Revista de la Sociedad Malacológica "Carlos de la Torre" 4(3): 88–90.
- Clench, W. J., and I. Pérez Farfante. 1945. The genus Murex in the Western Atlantic. Johnsonia 1(17): 1–58.
- Clench, W. J., and T. E. Pulley. 1952. Notes on some marine shells from the Gulf of Mexico with a description of a new species of Conus. Texas Journal of Science 4(1): 59–61.
- Clench, W. J., and R. D. Turner. 1948. The genus Truncatella in the Western Atlantic. Johnsonia 2(25): 149–164.
- Clench, W. J., and R. D. Turner. 1950. The genera Sthenorytis, Cirsotrema, Acirsa, Opalia and Amaea in the Western Atlantic. Johnsonia 2(29): 221–246.
- Clench, W. J., and R. D. Turner. 1951. The genus Epitonium in the Western Atlantic. Johnsonia 2(30): 249–288.
- Clench, W. J., and R. D. Turner. 1952. The genera Epitonium (part II), Depressiscala, Cylindriscala, Nystiella and Solutiscala in the Western Atlantic. Johnsonia 2(31): 289–356.
- Clench, W. J., and R. D. Turner. 1953. The genera Epitonium, Opalia and Cylindriscala in the Western Atlantic. Johnsonia 2(32): 361–363.
- Clench, W. J., and R. D. Turner. 1956. The family Melongenidae in the Western Atlantic. Johnsonia 3(35): 161–188.
- Clench, W. J., and R. D. Turner. 1957. The family Cymatiidae in the Western Atlantic. Johnsonia 3(36): 189–244.
- Clench, W. J., and R. D. Turner. 1960. The genus Calliostoma in the Western Atlantic. Johnsonia 4(40): 1–80.

== Sources ==
- Abbott RT (1984). "A Farewell to Bill Clench". The Nautilus 98 (2): 55–58.
