= Syllegomydini =

Scientific classification
- Kingdom: Animalia
- Phylum: Arthropoda
- Class: Insecta
- Order: Diptera
- Family: Mydidae
- Subfamily: Syllegomydinae
- Tribe: Syllegomydini

Tribe of flies

Syllegomydini is a tribe of flies in the family Mydidae.

== Genera ==
- Afroleptomydas Bequaert, 1961
- Agaperemius Hesse, 1969
- Arenomydas Hesse, 1969
- Eremohaplomydas Bequaert, 1960
- Haplomydas Bezzi, 1924
- Heteroleptomydas Bequaert, 1963
- Lachnocorynus Hesse, 1969
- Mahafalymydas Carr & Irwin, 2005
- Namadytes Hesse, 1969
- Nomoneura Bezzi, 1924
- Nomoneuroides Hesse, 1969
- Notosyllegomydas Hesse, 1969
- Oreomydas Hesse, 1969
- Syllegomydas Becker, 1906
