= Afroleptomydas subclausus =

Scientific classification
- Kingdom: Animalia
- Phylum: Arthropoda
- Class: Insecta
- Order: Diptera
- Family: Mydidae
- Subfamily: Syllegomydinae
- Tribe: Syllegomydini
- Genus: Afroleptomydas
- Species: A. subclausus

Binomial name
- Afroleptomydas subclausus (Bezzi, 1924)

Synonyms
- Leptomydas subclausus Bezzi, 1924

Species of fly

Afroleptomydas subclausus is a species of mydas flies in the family Mydidae.

== Distribution ==
South Africa.
