= Perissocerus abyssinicus =

Scientific classification
- Kingdom: Animalia
- Phylum: Arthropoda
- Class: Insecta
- Order: Diptera
- Family: Mydidae
- Subfamily: Rhopaliinae
- Genus: Perissocerus
- Species: P. abyssinicus

Binomial name
- Perissocerus abyssinicus Gerstaecker, 1868

Species of fly

Perissocerus abyssinicus is a species of mydas flies (insects in the family Mydidae).

== Distribution ==
Ethiopia.
