= Afroleptomydas mauricei =

Scientific classification
- Kingdom: Animalia
- Phylum: Arthropoda
- Class: Insecta
- Order: Diptera
- Family: Mydidae
- Subfamily: Syllegomydinae
- Tribe: Syllegomydini
- Genus: Afroleptomydas
- Species: A. mauricei

Binomial name
- Afroleptomydas mauricei Bequaert, 1961

Species of fly

Afroleptomydas mauricei is a species of mydas flies in the family Mydidae.

== Distribution ==
Botswana.
