= Namibimydas gaerdesi =

Scientific classification
- Kingdom: Animalia
- Phylum: Arthropoda
- Class: Insecta
- Order: Diptera
- Family: Mydidae
- Subfamily: Syllegomydinae
- Tribe: Halterorchini
- Genus: Namibimydas
- Species: N. gaerdesi

Binomial name
- Namibimydas gaerdesi Hesse, 1972

Species of fly

Namibimydas gaerdesi is a species of mydas flies in the family Mydidae.

== Distribution ==
Namibia.
