= Mydas arizonensis =

Scientific classification
- Kingdom: Animalia
- Phylum: Arthropoda
- Class: Insecta
- Order: Diptera
- Family: Mydidae
- Subfamily: Mydinae
- Tribe: Mydini
- Genus: Mydas
- Species: M. arizonensis

Binomial name
- Mydas arizonensis Wilcox, et Al., 1989

Species of fly

Mydas arizonensis is a species of mydas flies in the family Mydidae.

== Distribution ==
United States.
