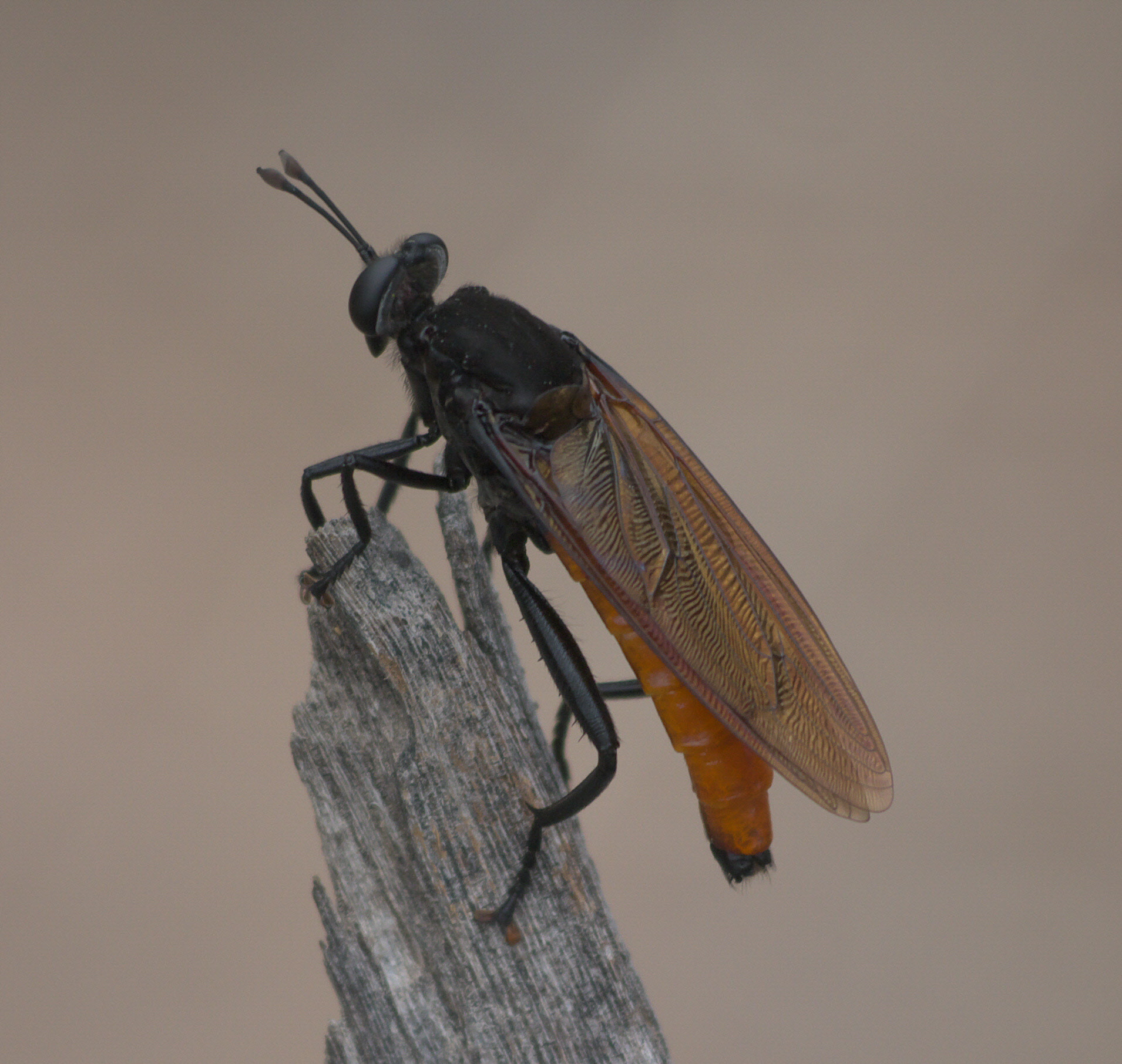

Scientific classification
- Kingdom: Animalia
- Phylum: Arthropoda
- Class: Insecta
- Order: Diptera
- Family: Mydidae
- Subfamily: Mydinae
- Tribe: Mydini
- Genus: Mydas
- Species: M. ventralis

Binomial name
- Mydas ventralis (Gerstäcker, 1868)

Synonyms
- Midas rufiventris Loew, 1866; Midas ventralis Gerstäcker, 1868; Mydas abdominalis Adams, 1904

= Mydas ventralis =

Species of fly

Mydas ventralis is a species of mydas flies in the family Mydidae.

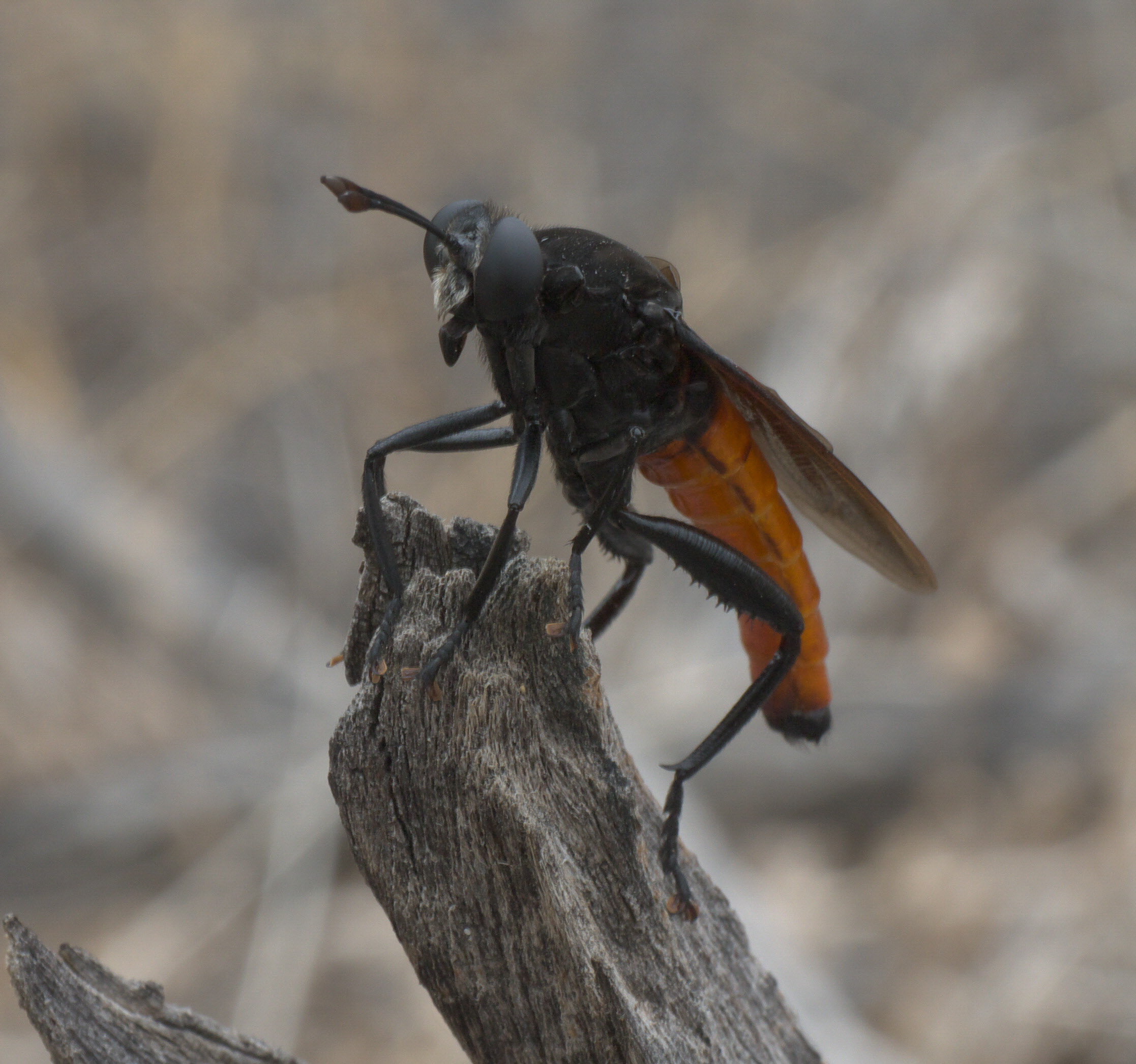
