= Mydas luteipennis =

Scientific classification
- Kingdom: Animalia
- Phylum: Arthropoda
- Class: Insecta
- Order: Diptera
- Family: Mydidae
- Subfamily: Mydinae
- Tribe: Mydini
- Genus: Mydas
- Species: M. luteipennis

Binomial name
- Mydas luteipennis (Loew, 1866)

Synonyms
- Midas luteipennis Loew, 1866; Midas simplex Loew, 1866

Species of fly

Mydas luteipennis is a species of mydas flies in the family Mydidae.

== Distribution ==
New Mexico.
