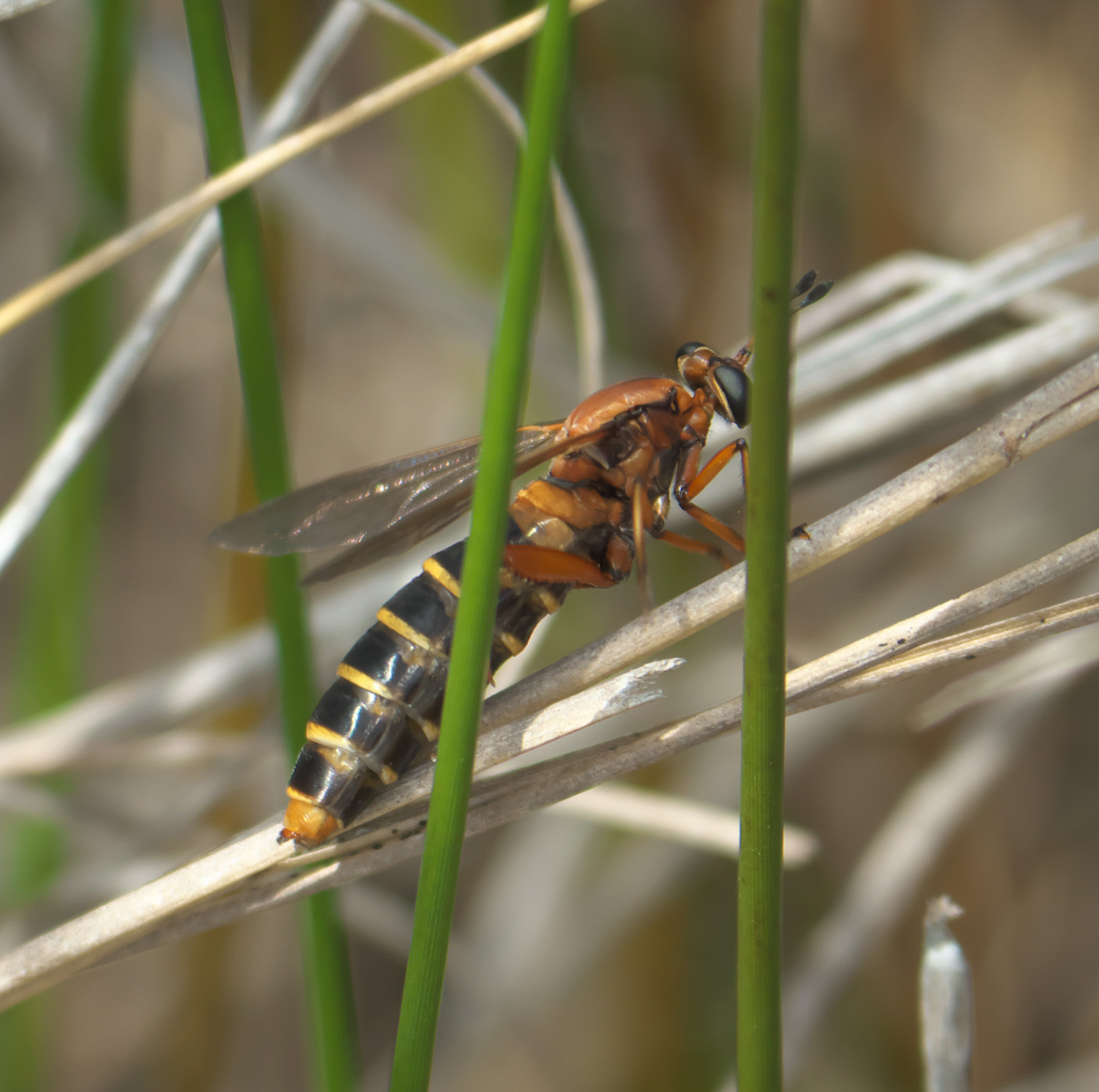

Scientific classification
- Kingdom: Animalia
- Phylum: Arthropoda
- Class: Insecta
- Order: Diptera
- Family: Mydidae
- Subfamily: Mydinae
- Tribe: Mydini
- Genus: Mydas
- Species: M. maculiventris

Binomial name
- Mydas maculiventris (Westwood, 1835)

Synonyms
- Midas incisus Macquart, 1838; Midas maculiventris Westwood, 1835; Midas pachygaster Westwood, 1841; Midas parvulus Westwood, 1841

= Mydas maculiventris =

Species of fly

Mydas maculiventris is a species of mydas flies in the family Mydidae.

== Distribution ==
United States.
