= Messiasia carrerai =

Scientific classification
- Kingdom: Animalia
- Phylum: Arthropoda
- Class: Insecta
- Order: Diptera
- Family: Mydidae
- Subfamily: Mydinae
- Tribe: Messiasiini
- Genus: Messiasia
- Species: M. carrerai

Binomial name
- Messiasia carrerai Andretta, 1951

Species of fly

Messiasia carrerai is a species of mydas flies in the family Mydidae.

== Distribution ==
Brazil.
