= Opomydas limbatus =

Scientific classification
- Kingdom: Animalia
- Phylum: Arthropoda
- Class: Insecta
- Order: Diptera
- Family: Mydidae
- Subfamily: Ectyphinae
- Genus: Opomydas
- Species: O. limbatus

Binomial name
- Opomydas limbatus (Williston, 1886)

Synonyms
- Ectyphus limbatus Williston, 1886; Ectyphus athamas Séguy, 1928

Species of fly

Opomydas limbatus is a species of mydas flies (insects in the family Mydidae).

== Distribution ==
United States. Mexico.
