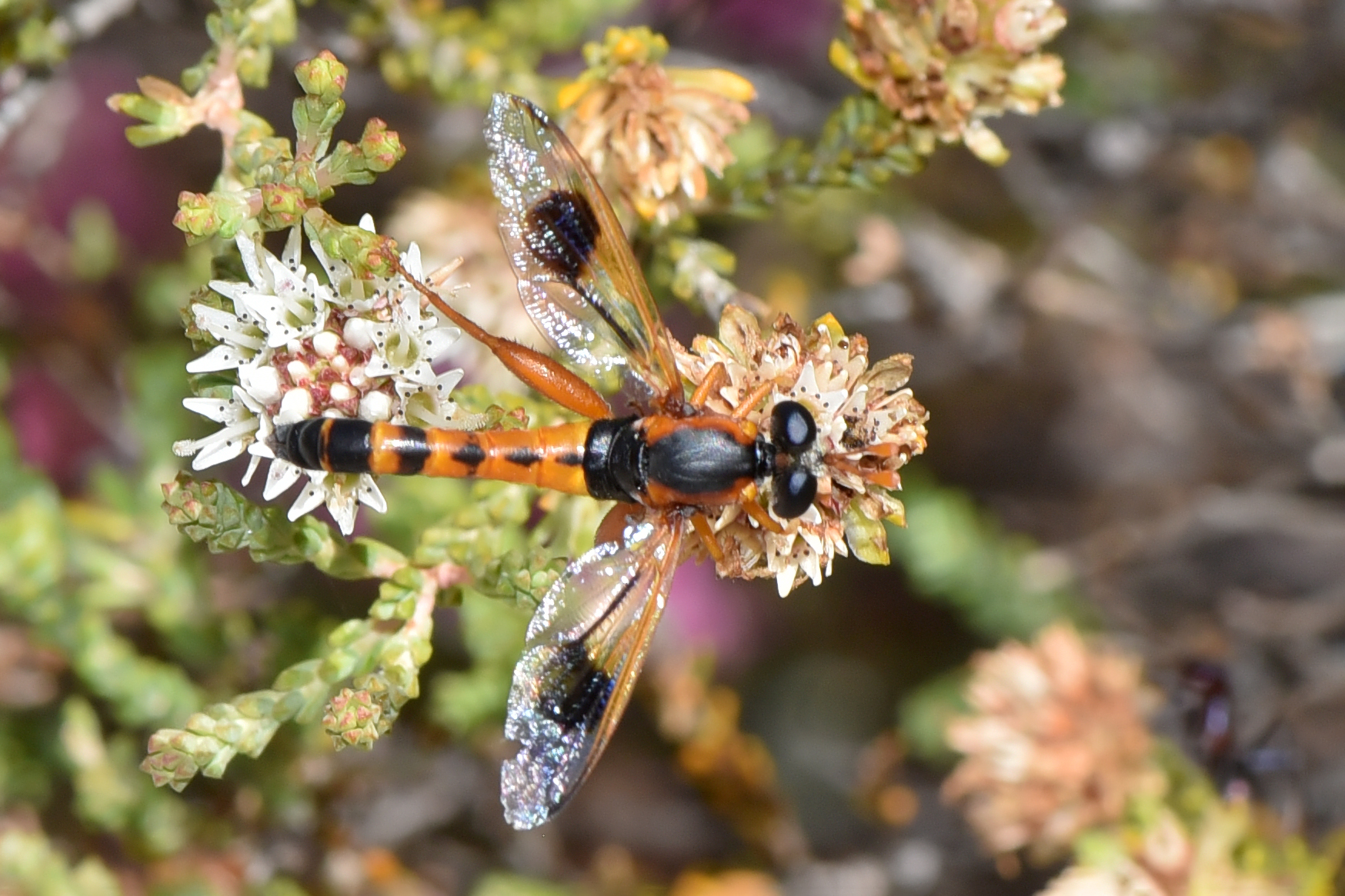
- Miltinus cinctus

Scientific classification
- Kingdom: Animalia
- Phylum: Arthropoda
- Class: Insecta
- Order: Diptera
- Family: Mydidae
- Subfamily: Apiophorinae
- Genus: Midacritus; Gerstaecker, 1868

Type species
- Miltinus cardinalis Gerstaecker, 1868

= Miltinus =

Genus of flies

Miltinus is a genus of flies in the family Mydidae.

== Species ==
- Miltinus atripennis Paramonov, 1955
- Miltinus atripes Paramonov, 1950
- Miltinus brunneus Paramonov, 1961
- Miltinus cardinalis Gerstaecker, 1868
- Miltinus cinctus Paramonov, 1955
- Miltinus commoni Paramonov, 1950
- Miltinus confrater Paramonov, 1955
- Miltinus dentipennis Mackerras, 1928
- Miltinus erythronotus Paramonov, 1961
- Miltinus insularis Paramonov, 1961
- Miltinus maculipennis (Westwood, 1841)
- Miltinus minutus Mackerras, 1928
- Miltinus musgravei Mackerras, 1928
- Miltinus norrisi Paramonov, 1950
- Miltinus parviduatus Paramonov, 1950
- Miltinus rieki Paramonov, 1950
- Miltinus sordidus (Westwood, 1848)
- Miltinus stenogaster (Westwood, 1841)
- Miltinus tenuis Mackerras, 1928
- Miltinus varipes (Macquart, 1850)
- Miltinus viduatus (Westwood, 1835)
