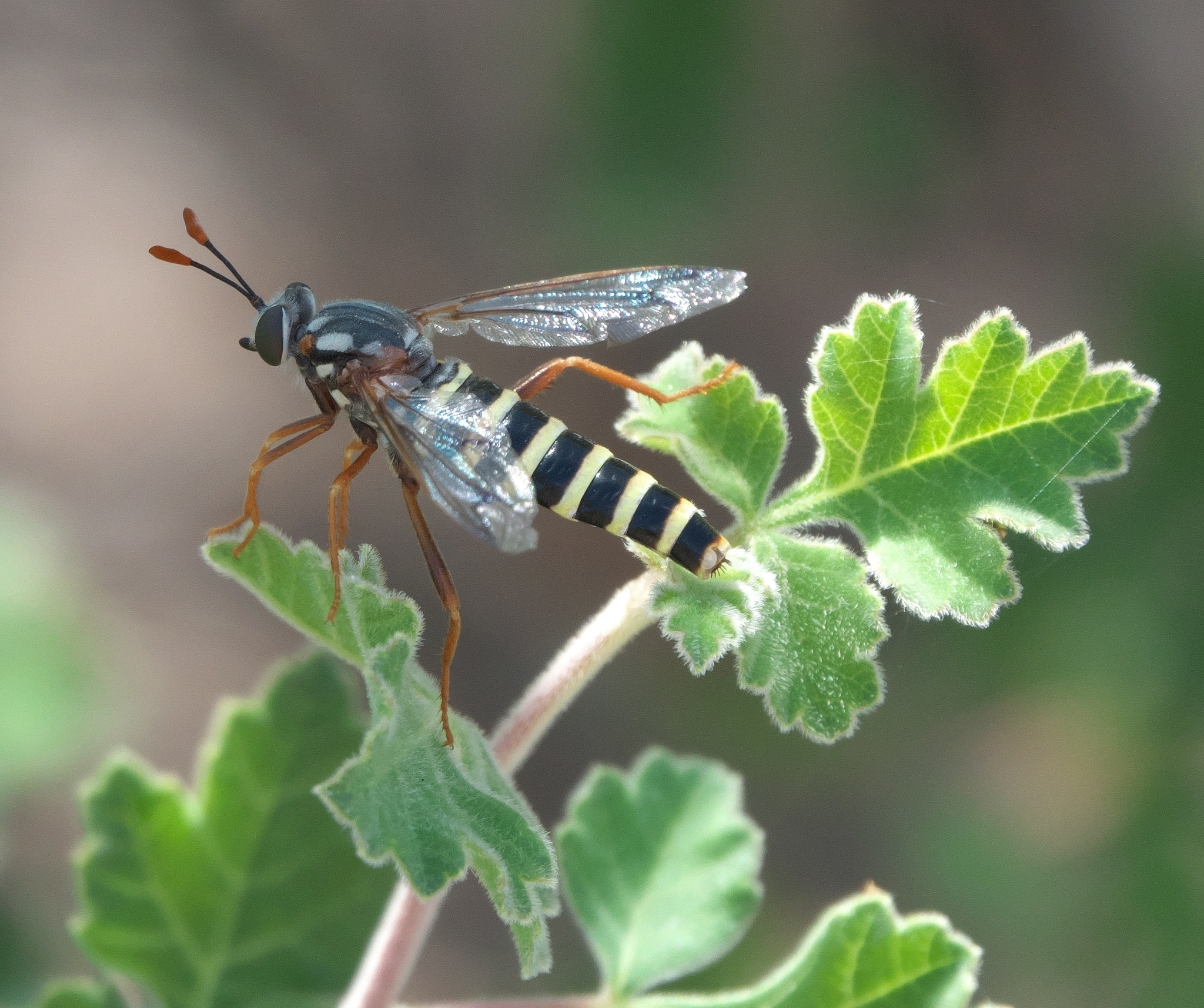
- Opomydas townsendi, New Mexico

Scientific classification
- Kingdom: Animalia
- Phylum: Arthropoda
- Class: Insecta
- Order: Diptera
- Family: Mydidae
- Subfamily: Ectyphinae
- Genus: Opomydas
- Species: O. townsendi

Binomial name
- Opomydas townsendi (Williston, 1898)

Synonyms
- Ectyphus townsendi Williston, 1898

= Opomydas townsendi =

Species of fly

Opomydas townsendi is a species of mydas flies (insects in the family Mydidae). It is found in New Mexico.
