= Messiasia pertenuis =

Scientific classification
- Kingdom: Animalia
- Phylum: Arthropoda
- Class: Insecta
- Order: Diptera
- Family: Mydidae
- Subfamily: Mydinae
- Tribe: Messiasiini
- Genus: Messiasia
- Species: M. pertenuis

Binomial name
- Messiasia pertenuis (Johnson, 1926)

Synonyms
- Mydas pertenuis Johnson, 1926

Species of fly

Messiasia pertenuis is a species of mydas flies in the family Mydidae.

== Distribution ==
Mexico.
