= Heteromydas bicolor =

Scientific classification
- Kingdom: Animalia
- Phylum: Arthropoda
- Class: Insecta
- Order: Diptera
- Family: Mydidae
- Subfamily: Ectyphinae
- Genus: Heteromydas
- Species: H. bicolor

Binomial name
- Heteromydas bicolor Hardy, 1944

Species of fly

Heteromydas bicolor is a species of mydas flies in the family Mydidae.

== Distribution ==
California.
