= Heteromydas chrysites =

Scientific classification
- Kingdom: Animalia
- Phylum: Arthropoda
- Clade: Pancrustacea
- Class: Insecta
- Order: Diptera
- Family: Mydidae
- Subfamily: Ectyphinae
- Genus: Heteromydas
- Species: H. chrysites

Binomial name
- Heteromydas chrysites (Osten Sacken, 1886)

Synonyms
- Midas chrysites Osten Sacken, 1886

Species of fly

Heteromydas chrysites is a species of mydas flies in the family Mydidae.

== Distribution ==
Arizona.
