= Mitrodetus dentitarsis =

Scientific classification
- Kingdom: Animalia
- Phylum: Arthropoda
- Class: Insecta
- Order: Diptera
- Family: Mydidae
- Subfamily: Diochlistinae
- Genus: Mitrodetus
- Species: M. dentitarsis

Binomial name
- Mitrodetus dentitarsis (Macquart, 1850)

Synonyms
- Cephalocera dentitarsis Macquart, 1850; Cephalocera albocinctus Blanchard, 1854; Cephalocera elegans Philippi, 1865

Species of fly

Mitrodetus dentitarsis is a species of mydas flies in the family Mydidae.

== Distribution ==
Chile.
