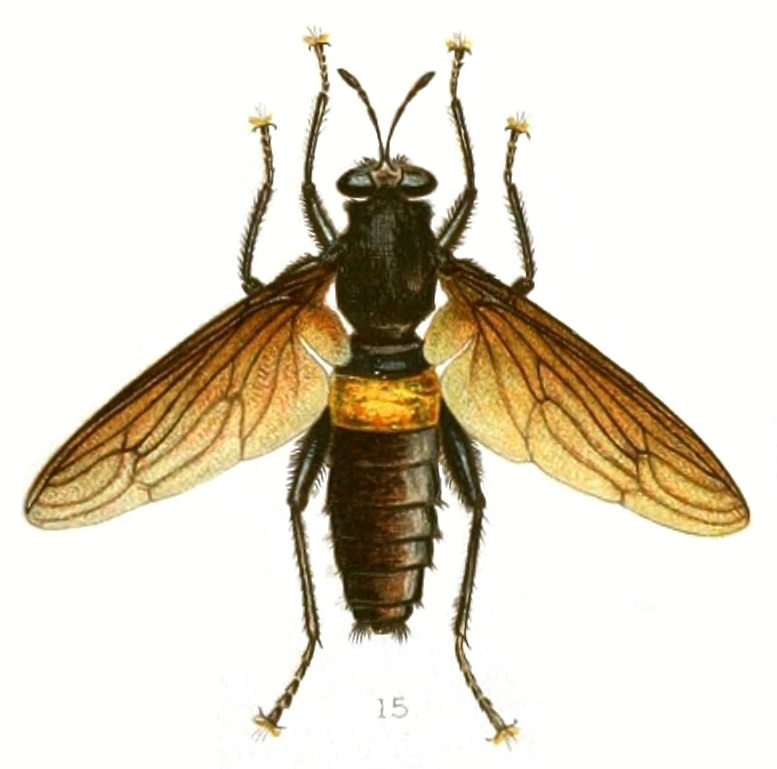

Scientific classification
- Kingdom: Animalia
- Phylum: Arthropoda
- Class: Insecta
- Order: Diptera
- Family: Mydidae
- Subfamily: Mydinae
- Tribe: Mydini
- Genus: Mydas
- Species: M. clavatus

Binomial name
- Mydas clavatus (Drury, 1773)

Synonyms
- Musca clavata Drury, 1773; Bibio filata Fabricius, 1775; Nemotelus asiloides De Geer, 1776

= Mydas clavatus =

Clubbed mydas fly

Species of fly

Mydas clavatus, the clubbed mydas fly, is a species of Mydas fly that is native to temperate, eastern North America. It is named for its clubbed antennae, which is however a general feature of the Mydas flies. An orange to red mark on the abdomen is distinctive. It is a Batesian mimic of certain spider wasps, and is consequently quite bold in its movements. Adults fly in mid-summer.

== Description ==
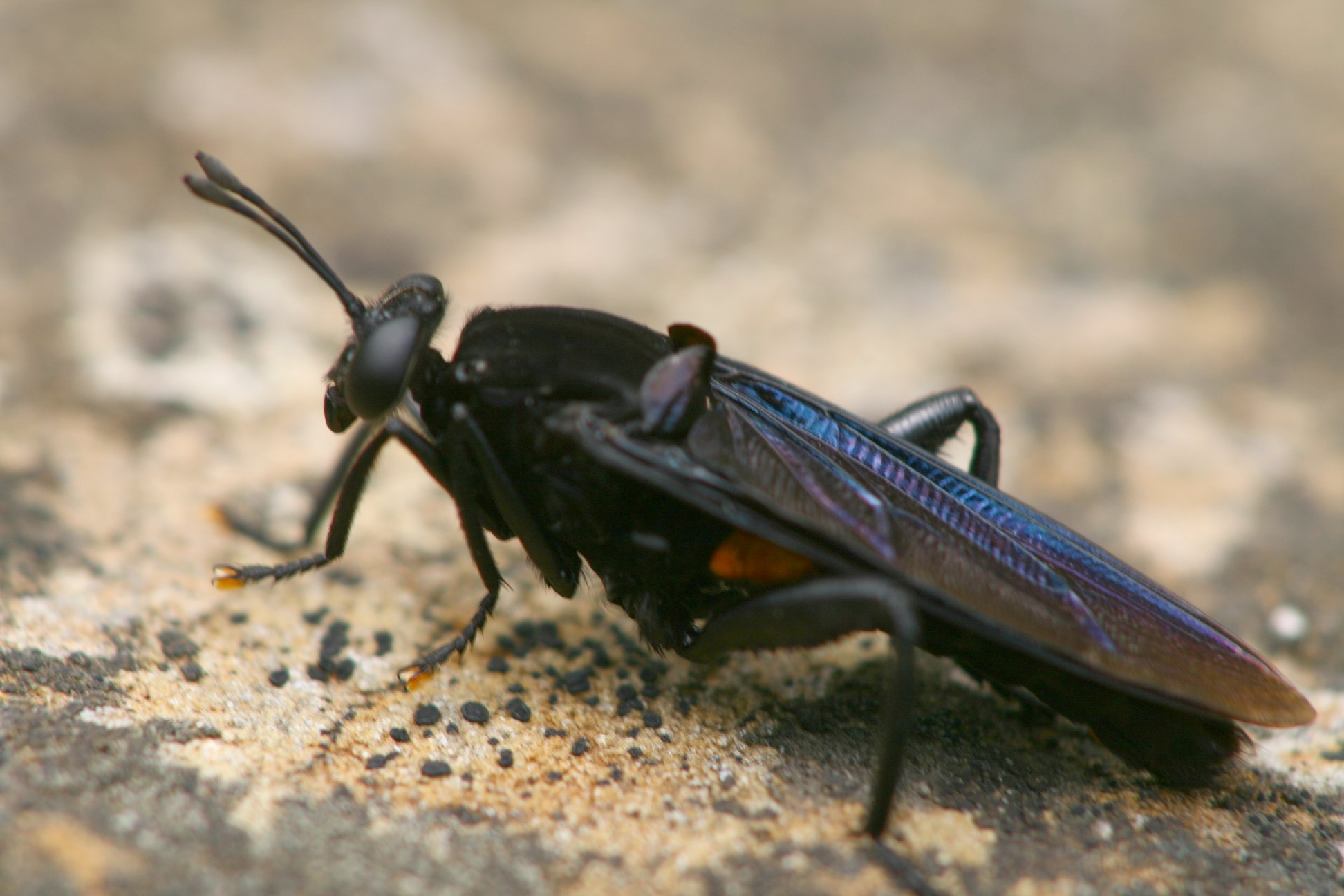
Adult at Frozen Head State Park, Tennessee

They are large, black and somewhat glabrate flies that measure some 25 to 30 mm in length, with a wingspan that may exceed 50 mm. A prominent orange to red mark is evident on the ventral side of the second abdominal segment. Their visual mimicry is apparently complemented by curling and jabbing of the abdomen in a mock stinging routine.

== Biology ==
The eggs are deposited singly in soil or rotting wood. The larvae, as with M. brunneus and M. tibialis, are predatory on the larvae of deadwood-feeding scarab beetles (Osmoderma species.) and can be found in standing and downed trees with extensive heart rot. The adults seem to be pollen and nectar feeders only, and have been observed at Asclepias, Saponana, Spiraea, Monarda, Pycnanthemum, Teucrium and Verbena flowers. When not nectaring, adults may be seen resting on plants or actively running around on the ground. Though the mating behaviour is unknown, it is suspected that males may defend the vicinity of larval food sources.

== Habitat ==
They are present in various habitats, including deciduous woodlands, fields, meadows, gardens, and other.
