= Mitrodetus australis =

Scientific classification
- Kingdom: Animalia
- Phylum: Arthropoda
- Class: Insecta
- Order: Diptera
- Family: Mydidae
- Subfamily: Diochlistinae
- Genus: Mitrodetus
- Species: M. australis

Binomial name
- Mitrodetus australis Artigas & Palma, 1979

Species of fly

Mitrodetus australis is a species of mydas flies in the family Mydidae.

== Distribution ==
This species is native to Argentina.
