= Megachile derasa =

Scientific classification
- Domain: Eukaryota
- Kingdom: Animalia
- Phylum: Arthropoda
- Class: Insecta
- Order: Hymenoptera
- Family: Megachilidae
- Genus: Megachile
- Species: M. derasa

Binomial name
- Megachile derasa Gerstaecker, 1869

Species of leafcutter bee (Megachile)

Megachile derasa is a species of bee in the family Megachilidae. It was described by Carl Eduard Adolph Gerstaecker in 1869.
