= Afroleptomydas =

Scientific classification
- Kingdom: Animalia
- Phylum: Arthropoda
- Class: Insecta
- Order: Diptera
- Family: Mydidae
- Subfamily: Syllegomydinae
- Tribe: Syllegomydini
- Genus: Afroleptomydas; Bequaert, 1961

Type species
- Afroleptomydas mauricei Béquaert, 1961

Synonyms
- Crossoprosopus Hesse, 1969

Genus of flies

Afroleptomydas is a genus of flies in the family Mydidae.

== Species ==
- Afroleptomydas angolensis Hesse, 1972
- Afroleptomydas anomalus Hesse, 1969
- Afroleptomydas anthophilus Hesse, 1969
- Afroleptomydas anuliventris Hesse, 1969
- Afroleptomydas apiformis Hesse, 1969
- Afroleptomydas apricus Hesse, 1969
- Afroleptomydas aquilus Hesse, 1972
- Afroleptomydas aridicolus Hesse, 1972
- Afroleptomydas bezzianus Béquaert, 1963
- Afroleptomydas boothi Hesse, 1969
- Afroleptomydas braunsi (Bezzi, 1924)
- Afroleptomydas browni Hesse, 1972
- Afroleptomydas campestris Hesse, 1969
- Afroleptomydas campsomeroides Hesse, 1969
- Afroleptomydas capensis Hesse, 1969
- Afroleptomydas capicolus Hesse, 1969
- Afroleptomydas cognatus Hesse, 1972
- Afroleptomydas consanguineus Hesse, 1969
- Afroleptomydas damarensis Hesse, 1972
- Afroleptomydas fasciatus (Wiedemann, 1828)
- Afroleptomydas femoralis Hesse, 1972
- Afroleptomydas flavidorsalis Hesse, 1969
- Afroleptomydas flavigenualis Hesse, 1969
- Afroleptomydas flavirostris (Bezzi, 1924)
- Afroleptomydas flavitibialis Hesse, 1969
- Afroleptomydas gessi Hesse, 1969
- Afroleptomydas gigantulus Hesse, 1969
- Afroleptomydas griquaensis Hesse, 1969
- Afroleptomydas hirtipes Hesse, 1969
- Afroleptomydas humeralis (Gerstaecker, 1868)
- Afroleptomydas inhacae Hesse, 1969
- Afroleptomydas inopinus Hesse, 1969
- Afroleptomydas junodi Béquaert, 1963
- Afroleptomydas kaokoensis Hesse, 1969
- Afroleptomydas karooanus Hesse, 1969
- Afroleptomydas koupicolus Hesse, 1969
- Afroleptomydas lampronotus Hesse, 1969
- Afroleptomydas lanipes (Bezzi, 1924)
- Afroleptomydas latipennis Hesse, 1969
- Afroleptomydas lindneri Hesse, 1972
- Afroleptomydas luteocinctus Hesse, 1969
- Afroleptomydas marginipunctatus Hesse, 1969
- Afroleptomydas matetsiensis Béquaert, 1963
- Afroleptomydas mauricei Béquaert, 1961
- Afroleptomydas microareolatus Hesse, 1969
- Afroleptomydas microreticulatus Hesse, 1969
- Afroleptomydas milnertonensis Béquaert, 1963
- Afroleptomydas namaquensis Hesse, 1969
- Afroleptomydas nigrescens Hesse, 1972
- Afroleptomydas nitens Béquaert, 1963
- Afroleptomydas nitidus (Bezzi, 1924)
- Afroleptomydas nitidusculus Hesse, 1969
- Afroleptomydas occidentalis Hesse, 1969
- Afroleptomydas omeri (Stuckenberg, 1955)
- Afroleptomydas opacicinctus Hesse, 1969
- Afroleptomydas opacus (Bezzi, 1924)
- Afroleptomydas orangiae Hesse, 1969
- Afroleptomydas ovamboensis Hesse, 1972
- Afroleptomydas paganus (Gerstaecker, 1868)
- Afroleptomydas pallidipes Hesse, 1969
- Afroleptomydas patruelis Hesse, 1969
- Afroleptomydas psammophilus Hesse, 1969
- Afroleptomydas pseudolanipes Béquaert, 1963
- Afroleptomydas pseudoopacus Béquaert, 1963
- Afroleptomydas pulverulentus Hesse, 1969
- Afroleptomydas rubellus Hesse, 1969
- Afroleptomydas rudebecki (Béquaert, 1960)
- Afroleptomydas rufihirtus Hesse, 1969
- Afroleptomydas rufithorax (Wiedemann, 1821)
- Afroleptomydas rusticanus Hesse, 1969
- Afroleptomydas rutilus Hesse, 1969
- Afroleptomydas saeculus Hesse, 1969
- Afroleptomydas similimus Hesse, 1969
- Afroleptomydas simulans Hesse, 1969
- Afroleptomydas sobrinus Hesse, 1969
- Afroleptomydas sodalicus Hesse, 1969
- Afroleptomydas sorbens Hesse, 1969
- Afroleptomydas stevensoni (Béquaert, 1938)
- Afroleptomydas subclausus (Bezzi, 1924)
- Afroleptomydas suffusipennis (Brunetti, 1929)
- Afroleptomydas thorni Hesse, 1969
- Afroleptomydas tuliensis Hesse, 1969
- Afroleptomydas turneri Béquaert, 1963
- Afroleptomydas vallicolus Hesse, 1969
- Afroleptomydas vansoni Hesse, 1969
- Afroleptomydas villosus Hesse, 1969
- Afroleptomydas westermanni (Wiedemann, 1819)
- Afroleptomydas zinni Hesse, 1969
