= Belemiana =

Scientific classification
- Kingdom: Animalia
- Phylum: Arthropoda
- Class: Insecta
- Order: Diptera
- Family: Mydidae
- Subfamily: Mydinae
- Tribe: Mydini
- Genus: Belemiana; Ponting, 2021

Type species
- Utinga francai Papavero & Pimentel, 1989

Synonyms
- Utinga Papavero & Pimentel, 1989 (Preocc.)

Genus of flies

Belemiana is a genus of flies in the family Mydidae.

== Species ==
- Belemiana francai (Wilcox, Papavero & Pimentel, 1989)
