= Arenomydas =

Scientific classification
- Kingdom: Animalia
- Phylum: Arthropoda
- Class: Insecta
- Order: Diptera
- Family: Mydidae
- Subfamily: Syllegomydinae
- Tribe: Syllegomydini
- Genus: Arenomydas; Hesse, 1969

Type species
- Midas callosus Wiedemann, 1828

Genus of flies

Arenomydas is a genus of flies in the family Mydidae.

== Species ==
- Arenomydas bunochilus Hesse, 1969
- Arenomydas caerulescens Hesse, 1969
- Arenomydas callosus (Wiedemann, 1828)
- Arenomydas lightfooti Hesse, 1969
- Arenomydas namaquensis Hesse, 1969
- Arenomydas niger (Macquart, 1838)
- Arenomydas partitus (Gerstaecker, 1868)
- Arenomydas pleurostictus Hesse, 1969
- Arenomydas sentipes Hesse, 1969
