= Mitrodetus =

Scientific classification
- Kingdom: Animalia
- Phylum: Arthropoda
- Class: Insecta
- Order: Diptera
- Family: Mydidae
- Subfamily: Diochlistinae
- Genus: Mitrodetus; Gerstaecker, 1868

Type species
- Cephalocera dentitarsis Macquart, 1850

Genus of flies

Mitrodetus is a genus of flies in the family Mydidae.

== Species ==
- Mitrodetus australis Artigas & Palma, 1979
- Mitrodetus chilensis Reed & Ruiz, 1942
- Mitrodetus dentitarsis (Macquart, 1850)
- Mitrodetus dimidiatus (Philippi, 1865)
- Mitrodetus irwini Kondratieff & Carr, 2001
- Mitrodetus leucotrichus (Philippi, 1865)
- Mitrodetus matthei Reed & Ruiz, 1942
- Mitrodetus microglossa Séguy, 1951
- Mitrodetus nanoglossa Artigas & Palma, 1979
- Mitrodetus reedi Reed & Ruiz, 1942
- Mitrodetus thereviformis Séguy, 1938
- Mitrodetus vestitus Artigas & Palma, 1979
