= Syllegomydas =

Scientific classification
- Kingdom: Animalia
- Phylum: Arthropoda
- Clade: Pancrustacea
- Class: Insecta
- Order: Diptera
- Family: Mydidae
- Subfamily: Syllegomydinae
- Tribe: Syllegomydini
- Genus: Syllegomydas; Becker, 1906

Type species
- Mydas cinctus Macquart, 1835

Genus of flies

Syllegomydas is a genus of flies in the family Mydidae.

== Species ==
- Syllegomydas algiricus (Gerstaecker, 1868)
- Syllegomydas arnoldi Béquaert, 1938
- Syllegomydas astrictus Dikow, 2010
- Syllegomydas berlandi Séguy, 1941
- Syllegomydas bezzii Arias, 1914
- Syllegomydas botta (Macquart, 1850)
- Syllegomydas brachiatus Séguy, 1941
- Syllegomydas bueni Arias, 1914
- Syllegomydas cinctus (Macquart, 1835)
- Syllegomydas claripennis Becker, 1906
- Syllegomydas dallonii Séguy, 1936
- Syllegomydas dispar (Loew, 1852)
- Syllegomydas efflatouni Bezzi, 1924
- Syllegomydas elachys Dikow, 2010
- Syllegomydas gestroi Séguy, 1932
- Syllegomydas guichardi Béquaert, 1961
- Syllegomydas heothinos Dikow, 2010
- Syllegomydas lamborni Béquaert, 1951
- Syllegomydas maroccanus Séguy, 1928
- Syllegomydas merceti Arias, 1914
- Syllegomydas palestinensis Béquaert, 1961
- Syllegomydas proximus Séguy, 1928
- Syllegomydas rhodesiensis Béquaert, 1938
- Syllegomydas spinipes Bezzi, 1924
- Syllegomydas vittatus (Wiedemann, 1828)
