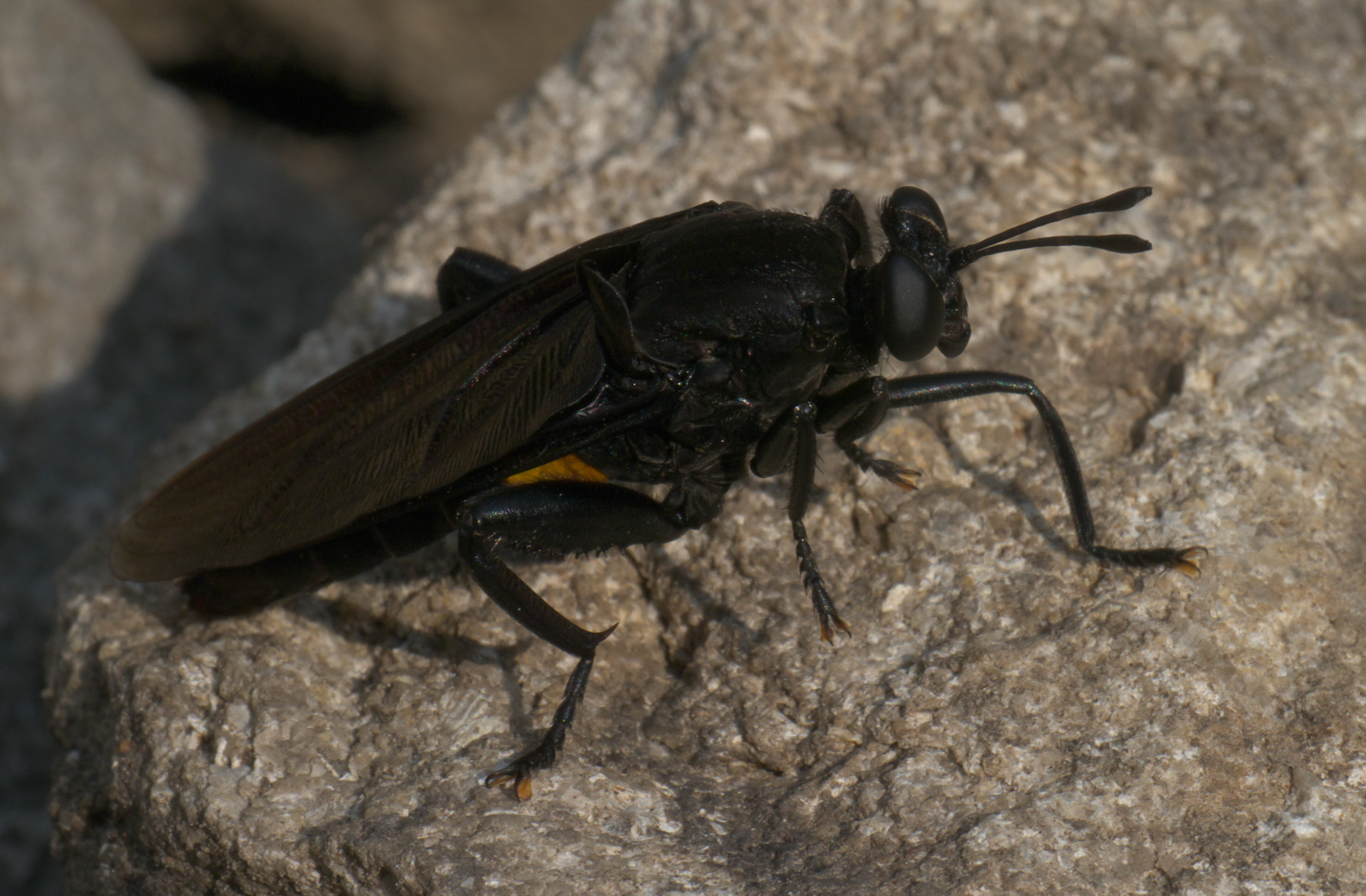
- Mydas clavatus

Scientific classification
- Kingdom: Animalia
- Phylum: Arthropoda
- Clade: Pancrustacea
- Class: Insecta
- Order: Diptera
- Family: Mydidae
- Subfamily: Mydinae
- Tribe: Mydini
- Genus: Mydas; Fabricius, 1794

Type species
- Musca clavata Drury, 1773

Synonyms
- Midas Latreille, 1797 (Missp.); Megotaria Gistel, 1848; Lampromydas Séguy, 1928

= Mydas =

Genus of flies

Mydas is a genus of flies in the family Mydidae.

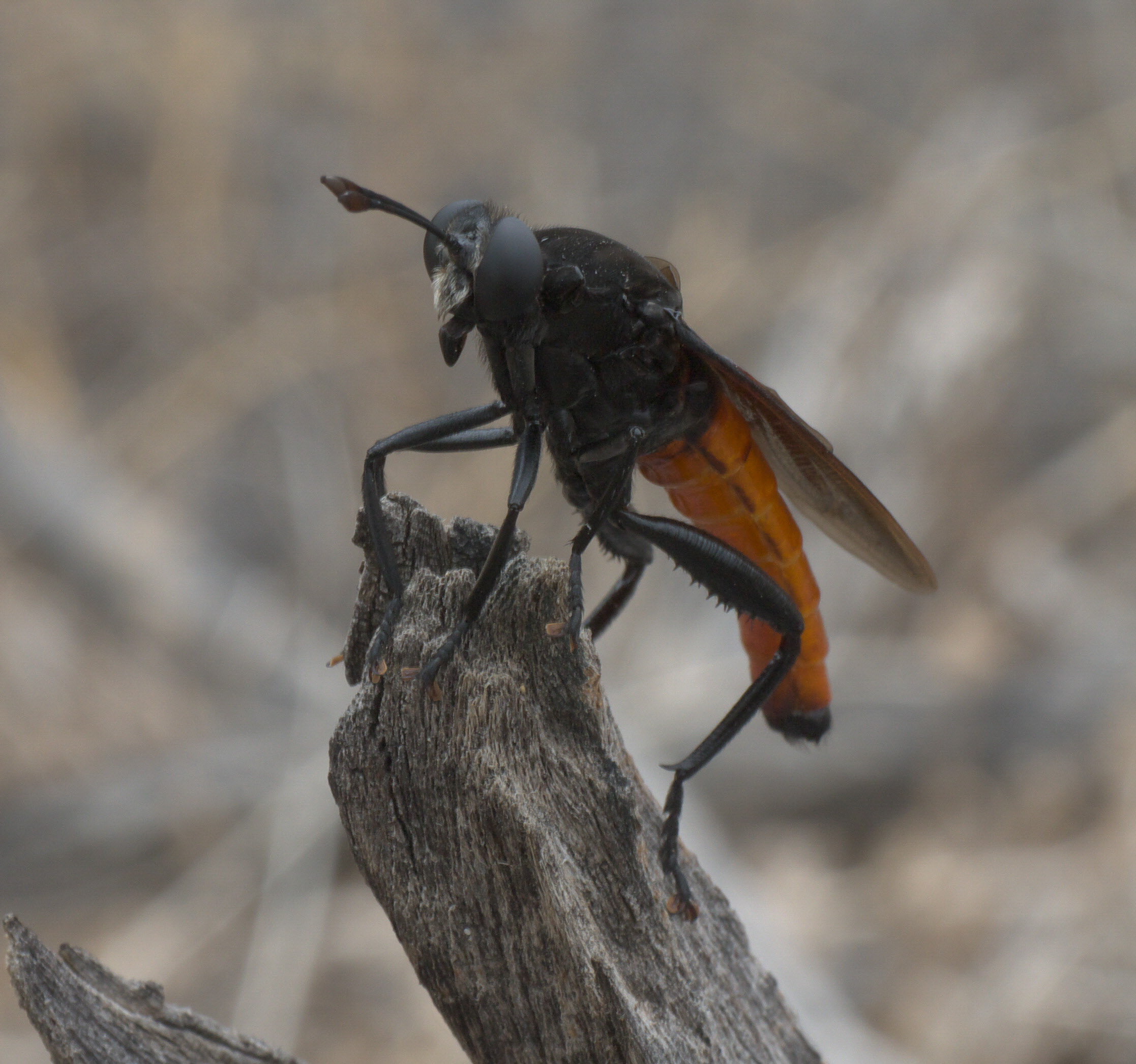
Mydas ventralis

== Species ==
- Mydas annularis Gerstaecker, 1868
- Mydas annulatus (Brunetti, 1912)
- Mydas apicalis Wiedemann, 1831
- Mydas argyrostomus Gerstaecker, 1868
- Mydas arizonensis Wilcox, Papavero & Pimentel, 1989
- Mydas atratus Macquart, 1838
- Mydas audax Osten Sacken, 1874
- Mydas autuorii Andretta, 1951
- Mydas belus (Séguy, 1928)
- Mydas bitaeniatus Bellardi, 1861
- Mydas boonei Curran, 1953
- Mydas brederi Curran, 1951
- Mydas brunneus Johnson, 1926
- Mydas bucciferus (Séguy, 1928)
- Mydas chrysostomus Sacken, 1874
- Mydas cingulatus Williston, 1898
- Mydas claripennis Williston, 1898
- Mydas clavatus (Drury, 1773)
- Mydas cleptes Osten Sacken, 1886
- Mydas crassipes Westwood, 1841
- Mydas davidsoni Wilcox, Papavero & Pimentel, 1989
- Mydas eupolis Séguy, 1928
- Mydas evansi Wilcox, Papavero & Pimentel, 1989
- Mydas evansorum Welch, 1991
- Mydas fisheri Wilcox, Papavero & Pimentel, 1989
- Mydas floridensis Wilcox, Papavero & Pimentel, 1989
- Mydas fulvifrons Illiger, 1801
- Mydas gracilis Macquart, 1834
- Mydas gruenbergi (Hermann, 1914)
- Mydas hardyi Wilcox, Papavero & Pimentel, 1989
- Mydas interruptus Wiedemann, 1831
- Mydas jaliscos Wilcox, Papavero & Pimentel, 1989
- Mydas lividus Curran, 1953
- Mydas luteipennis (Loew, 1866)
- Mydas maculiventris Westwood, 1835
- Mydas militaris Gerstaecker, 1868
- Mydas militarsis Gerstaecker, 1868
- Mydas miocenicus Cockerell, 1913
- Mydas mystaceus Wiedemann, 1831
- Mydas oaxacensis Wilcox, Papavero & Pimentel, 1989
- Mydas quadrilineatus Williston, 1898
- Mydas rubidapex Wiedemann, 1831
- Mydas rufiventris Macquart, 1850
- Mydas sarpedon Séguy, 1928
- Mydas sculleni Wilcox, Papavero & Pimentel, 1989
- Mydas subinterruptus Bellardi, 1861
- Mydas testaceiventris Macquart, 1850
- Mydas texanus Wilcox, Papavero & Pimentel, 1989
- Mydas tibialis (Wiedemann, 1831)
- Mydas tricinctus Bellardi, 1861
- Mydas tricolor Wiedemann, 1831
- Mydas ventralis Gerstaecker, 1868
- Mydas weemsi Wilcox, Papavero & Pimentel, 1989
- Mydas xanthopterus (Loew, 1866)
