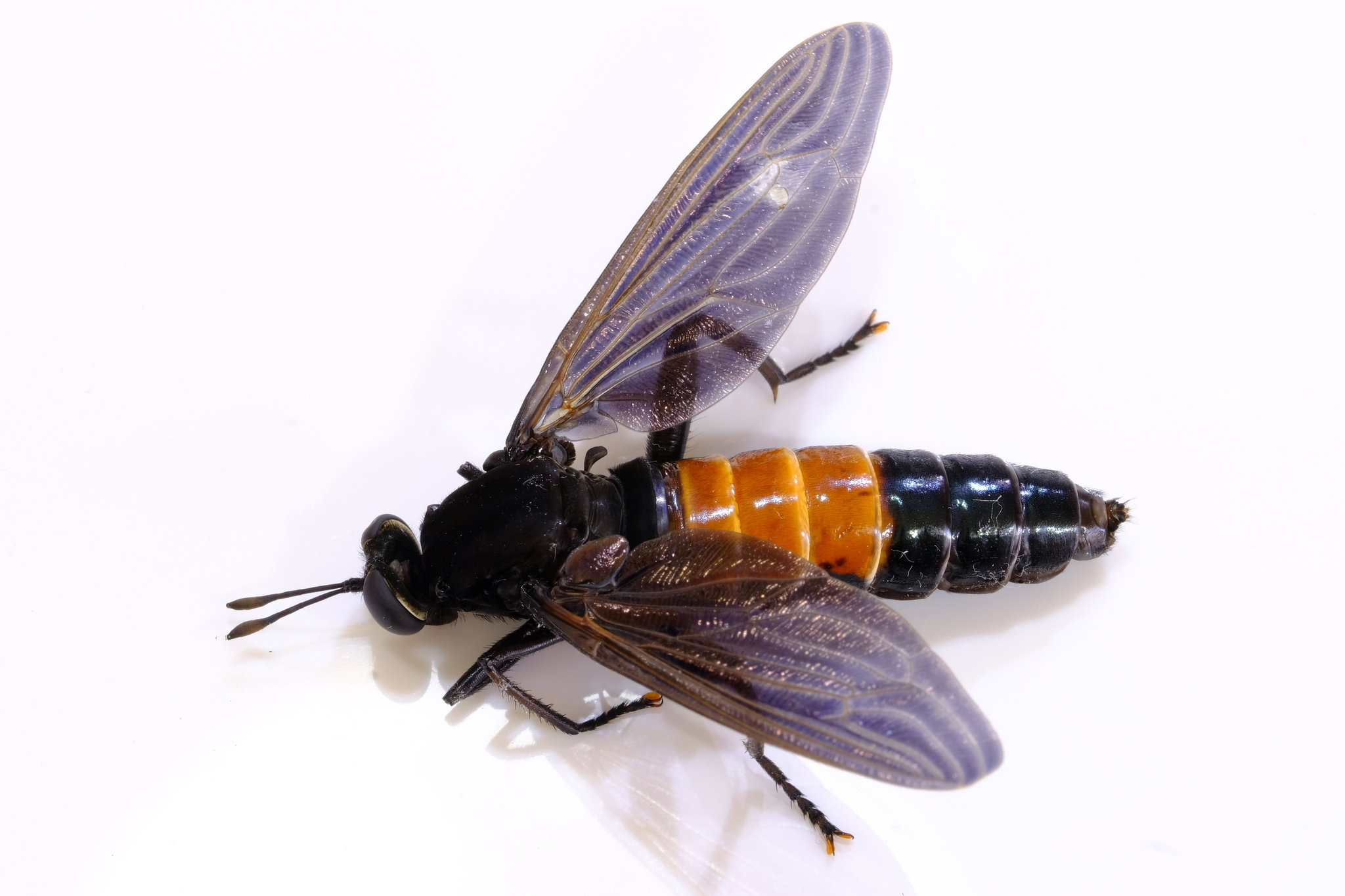

Scientific classification
- Kingdom: Animalia
- Phylum: Arthropoda
- Clade: Pancrustacea
- Class: Insecta
- Order: Diptera
- Family: Mydidae
- Genus: Mydas
- Species: M. chrysostomus

Binomial name
- Mydas chrysostomus Osten Sacken, 1874

= Mydas chrysostomus =

Species of fly

Mydas chrysostomus is a species of mydas fly in the family Mydidae. It is a large, wasp-mimicking fly characterized by a black body, orange-yellow abdominal markings, and clubbed antennae.

== Description ==
M. chrysostomus is a fly with a jet-black body and a wingspan of approximately 2 inches. It has golden-orange spots on the legs and a distinctive orange-yellow half-band on the abdomen. Like other members of the family Mydidae, it has elongate, four-segmented clubbed antennae and enlarged hind femora bearing numerous spines.

== Lifecycle ==
Females lay eggs in the soil by inserting the tip of their abdomen into the ground. The larvae are soil-dwelling predators that feed on other insect larvae, particularly beetle larvae. Pupae develop below the soil surface and emerge with the aid of strong spines before the adult fly emerges during the warmest part of the day.

== Distribution ==
Mydas flies occur worldwide, although the family contains fewer than 400 described species. Fifty-one species have been reported from North America, with most occurring in the western part of the continent.

Mydas chrysostomus has been recorded over 256 times within the southern United States.
