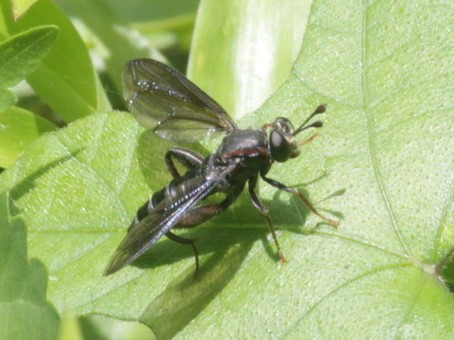
- Ectyphus armipes

Scientific classification
- Kingdom: Animalia
- Phylum: Arthropoda
- Class: Insecta
- Order: Diptera
- Family: Mydidae
- Subfamily: Ectyphinae
- Genus: Ectyphus; Gerstaecker, 1868

Type species
- Ectyphus pinguis Gerstaecker, 1868

Synonyms
- Ecthypus Aldrich, 1905; Ectypus Williston, 1886

= Ectyphus =

Genus of flies

Ectyphus is a genus of flies in the family Mydidae.

== Species ==
- Ectyphus abdominalis Bezzi, 1924
- Ectyphus amboseli Lyons & Dikow, 2010
- Ectyphus armipes Bezzi, 1924
- Ectyphus capillatus Hesse, 1969
- Ectyphus pinguis Gerstaecker, 1868
- Ectyphus pretoriensis Bezzi, 1924
