= Apiophorinae =

Scientific classification
- Domain: Eukaryota
- Kingdom: Animalia
- Phylum: Arthropoda
- Class: Insecta
- Order: Diptera
- Family: Mydidae
- Subfamily: Apiophorinae

Subfamily of insects

Apiophorinae is a subfamily of mydas flies in the family Mydidae.

== Genera ==
- Apiophora Philippi, 1865
- Eumydas Papavero, 1971
- Midacritus Séguy, 1938
- Miltinus Gerstaecker, 1868
- Paramydas Andretta, 1948
