= Cephalocerodes =

Scientific classification
- Kingdom: Animalia
- Phylum: Arthropoda
- Class: Insecta
- Order: Diptera
- Family: Mydidae
- Subfamily: Syllegomydinae
- Genus: Cephalocerodes; Hesse, 1969

Type species
- Cephalocera oldroydi (Béquaert, 1963)

Genus of flies

Cephalocerodes is a genus of flies in the family Mydidae.

== Species ==
- Cephalocerodes bequaerti Hesse, 1969
- Cephalocerodes eremobius Hesse, 1969
- Cephalocerodes oldroydi (Béquaert, 1963)
