= Neolaparopsis =

Scientific classification
- Kingdom: Animalia
- Phylum: Arthropoda
- Class: Insecta
- Order: Diptera
- Family: Mydidae
- Subfamily: Syllegomydinae
- Genus: Neolaparopsis; Hesse, 1969

Type species
- Neolaparopsis puncturata Hesse, 1969

Genus of flies

Neolaparopsis is a genus of flies in the family Mydidae.

== Species ==
- Neolaparopsis puncturata Hesse, 1969
