= Hispanomydas =

Scientific classification
- Kingdom: Animalia
- Phylum: Arthropoda
- Class: Insecta
- Order: Diptera
- Family: Mydidae
- Subfamily: Syllegomydinae
- Genus: Hispanomydas; Arias, 1914

Type species
- Hispanomydas hispanicus Arias, 1914

Genus of flies

Hispanomydas is a genus of flies in the family Mydidae.

== Species ==
- Hispanomydas hispanicus Arias, 1914
