= Mydaselpidini =

Scientific classification
- Kingdom: Animalia
- Phylum: Arthropoda
- Class: Insecta
- Order: Diptera
- Family: Mydidae
- Subfamily: Syllegomydinae
- Tribe: Mydaselpidini

Tribe of flies

Mydaselpidini is a tribe of flies in the family Mydidae.

== Genera ==
- Afromydas Bequaert, 1961
- Mydaselpis Bezzi, 1924
- Vespiodes Hesse, 1969
