= Pterolophia scripta =

Scientific classification
- Kingdom: Animalia
- Phylum: Arthropoda
- Clade: Pancrustacea
- Class: Insecta
- Order: Coleoptera
- Suborder: Polyphaga
- Infraorder: Cucujiformia
- Family: Cerambycidae
- Genus: Pterolophia
- Species: P. scripta

Binomial name
- Pterolophia scripta (Gerstaecker, 1871)

Species of beetle

Pterolophia scripta is a species of beetle in the family Cerambycidae. It was described by Carl Eduard Adolph Gerstaecker in 1871.
