= Perissocerus =

Scientific classification
- Kingdom: Animalia
- Phylum: Arthropoda
- Class: Insecta
- Order: Diptera
- Family: Mydidae
- Subfamily: Rhopaliinae
- Genus: Perissocerus; Gerstaecker, 1868

Type species
- Perissocerus abyssinicus Gerstaecker, 1868

Genus of flies

Perissocerus is a genus of flies in the family Mydidae.

== Species ==
- Perissocerus abyssinicus Gerstaecker, 1868
- Perissocerus arabicus Béquaert, 1961
- Perissocerus chobauti Villeneuve, 1926
- Perissocerus dumonti Séguy, 1928
- Perissocerus rungsi Séguy, 1953
- Perissocerus surcoufi Bezzi, 1921
- Perissocerus transcaspicus Portschinsky, 1901
