= Oberea pallidula =

Scientific classification
- Domain: Eukaryota
- Kingdom: Animalia
- Phylum: Arthropoda
- Class: Insecta
- Order: Coleoptera
- Suborder: Polyphaga
- Infraorder: Cucujiformia
- Family: Cerambycidae
- Genus: Oberea
- Species: O. pallidula

Binomial name
- Oberea pallidula Gerstaecker, 1855

Species of beetle

Oberea pallidula is a species of beetle in the family Cerambycidae. It was described by Carl Eduard Adolph Gerstaecker in 1855.
