= Diochlistus =

Scientific classification
- Kingdom: Animalia
- Phylum: Arthropoda
- Clade: Pancrustacea
- Class: Insecta
- Order: Diptera
- Family: Mydidae
- Subfamily: Diochlistinae
- Genus: Diochlistus; Gerstaecker, 1868

Type species
- Diochlistus mitis Gerstaecker, 1868

Synonyms
- Harmophana Thomson, 1869; Triclonus Gerstaecker, 1868

Genus of flies

Diochlistus is a genus of flies in the family Mydidae.

== Species ==
- Diochlistus analogus Paramonov, 1950
- Diochlistus apollinosus Paramonov, 1950
- Diochlistus auripennis (Westwood, 1835)
- Diochlistus edgari Paramonov, 1961
- Diochlistus gracilis (Macquart, 1847)
- Diochlistus hackeri Paramonov, 1950
- Diochlistus melleipennis (Westwood, 1848)
- Diochlistus mitis Gerstaecker, 1868
- Diochlistus neogracilis Hardy, 1949
- Diochlistus nicholsoni Mackerras, 1928
- Diochlistus paragracilis Paramonov, 1955
- Diochlistus tenebrosus Paramonov, 1950
