= Megachile foersteri =

Scientific classification
- Domain: Eukaryota
- Kingdom: Animalia
- Phylum: Arthropoda
- Class: Insecta
- Order: Hymenoptera
- Family: Megachilidae
- Genus: Megachile
- Species: M. foersteri

Binomial name
- Megachile foersteri Gerstaecker, 1869

Species of leafcutter bee (Megachile)

Megachile foersteri is a species of bee in the family Megachilidae. It was described by Carl Eduard Adolph Gerstaecker in 1869.
