= Megachile curtula =

Scientific classification
- Domain: Eukaryota
- Kingdom: Animalia
- Phylum: Arthropoda
- Class: Insecta
- Order: Hymenoptera
- Family: Megachilidae
- Genus: Megachile
- Species: M. curtula

Binomial name
- Megachile curtula Gerstaecker, 1857

Synonyms
- Megachile rauda Vachal, 1903; Megachile muscaria Vachal, 1903; Megachile cunicularia Friese, 1908; Megachile benitocola Strand, 1912; Megachile granulicauda Cockerell, 1931; Megachile phanerognatha Cockerell, 1935; Megachile sticeae Cockerell, 1937; Megachile bicingulata Cockerell, 1937; Megachile monsleonis Cockerell, 1945; Megachile teroensis Cockerell, 1945

Species of leafcutter bee (Megachile)

Megachile curtula is a species of bee in the family Megachilidae. It was described by Carl Eduard Adolph Gerstaecker in 1857.
