= Cephalocera =

Scientific classification
- Kingdom: Animalia
- Phylum: Arthropoda
- Class: Insecta
- Order: Diptera
- Family: Mydidae
- Subfamily: Syllegomydinae
- Tribe: Cephalocerini
- Genus: Cephalocera; Latreille, 1829

Type species
- Midas longirostris Wiedemann, 1831

Genus of flies

Cephalocera is a genus of flies in the family Mydidae.

== Species ==
- Cephalocera albida Hesse, 1969
- Cephalocera brachycera Bezzi, 1924
- Cephalocera brachyptera Hesse, 1969
- Cephalocera brunnipes Hesse, 1969
- Cephalocera caffrariensis Hesse, 1969
- Cephalocera catulus Gerstaecker, 1868
- Cephalocera decepta Hesse, 1969
- Cephalocera devia Hesse, 1969
- Cephalocera disparilis Hesse, 1969
- Cephalocera dysmachoides Hesse, 1969
- Cephalocera euryptera Hesse, 1969
- Cephalocera fascipennis Macquart, 1838
- Cephalocera flavilineata Hesse, 1969
- Cephalocera imitata Hesse, 1969
- Cephalocera longirostris (Wiedemann, 1831)
- Cephalocera macrocera Hesse, 1969
- Cephalocera meridionalis Hesse, 1969
- Cephalocera micheneri Hesse, 1969
- Cephalocera mimica Hesse, 1969
- Cephalocera namaquensis Hesse, 1969
- Cephalocera nigerrima Hesse, 1969
- Cephalocera nigrojubata Hesse, 1969
- Cephalocera propinqua Hesse, 1969
- Cephalocera riparia Hesse, 1969
- Cephalocera simulata Hesse, 1969
- Cephalocera trichogyna Hesse, 1969
- Cephalocera umbrina Gerstaecker, 1868
- Cephalocera xerophila Hesse, 1969
