= Mydas tibialis =

Scientific classification
- Kingdom: Animalia
- Phylum: Arthropoda
- Class: Insecta
- Order: Diptera
- Family: Mydidae
- Subfamily: Mydinae
- Tribe: Mydini
- Genus: Mydas
- Species: M. tibialis

Binomial name
- Mydas tibialis (Wiedemann, 1831)

Synonyms
- Midas fulvipes Walsh, 1864; Midas tibialis Wiedemann, 1831

Species of fly

Mydas tibialis, the golden legged mydas fly, is a species of mydas flies in the family Mydidae

== Distribution ==
North America.
