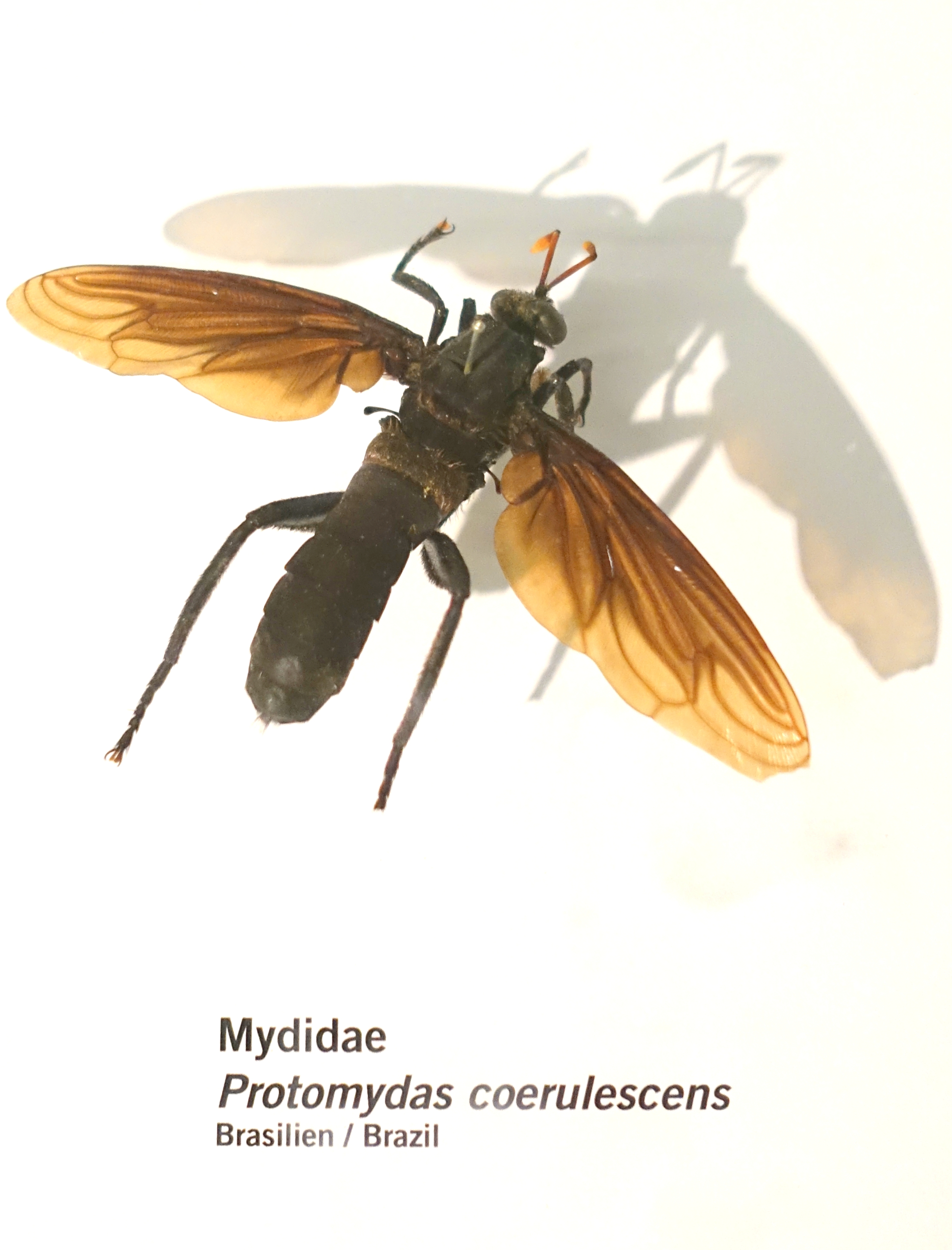
- Protomydas coerulescens

Scientific classification
- Kingdom: Animalia
- Phylum: Arthropoda
- Class: Insecta
- Order: Diptera
- Family: Mydidae
- Subfamily: Mydinae
- Tribe: Mydini
- Genus: Protomydas; Papavero & Pimentel, 1989

Type species
- Mydas coerulescens Olivier, 1811

= Protomydas =

Genus of flies

Protomydas is a genus of flies in the family Mydidae.

== Species ==
- Protomydas coerulescens (Olivier, 1811)
- Protomydas dives (Westwood, 1841)
- Protomydas leucops (Wiedemann, 1831)
