= Pseudorhopalia =

Scientific classification
- Kingdom: Animalia
- Phylum: Arthropoda
- Class: Insecta
- Order: Diptera
- Family: Mydidae
- Subfamily: Rhopaliinae
- Genus: Pseudorhopalia; Wilcox & Papavero, 1971

Type species
- Rhopalia mirandai Andretta & Carrera, 1951

Genus of flies

Pseudorhopalia is a genus of flies in the family Mydidae.

== Species ==
- Pseudorhopalia manauara Almeida, Lamas and Nihei, 2014
- Pseudorhopalia mirandai (Andretta & Carrera, 1951)
