= Agaperemius =

Scientific classification
- Kingdom: Animalia
- Phylum: Arthropoda
- Class: Insecta
- Order: Diptera
- Family: Mydidae
- Subfamily: Syllegomydinae
- Tribe: Syllegomydini
- Genus: Agaperemius; Hesse, 1969

Type species
- Agaperemius hirtus Hesse, 1969

Genus of flies

Agaperemius is a genus of flies in the family Mydidae.

== Species ==
- Agaperemius hirtus Hesse, 1969
