= Eumydas =

Scientific classification
- Kingdom: Animalia
- Phylum: Arthropoda
- Class: Insecta
- Order: Diptera
- Family: Mydidae
- Subfamily: Apiophorinae
- Genus: Eumydas; Papavero, 1971

Type species
- Eumydas corupas Wilcox & Papavero, 1971

Genus of flies

Eumydas is a genus of flies in the family Mydidae.

== Species ==
- Eumydas corupas Wilcox & Papavero, 1971
