= Cacatuopyga =

Scientific classification
- Kingdom: Animalia
- Phylum: Arthropoda
- Class: Insecta
- Order: Diptera
- Family: Mydidae
- Subfamily: Cacatuopyginae
- Genus: Cacatuopyga; Papavero & Wilcox, 1974

Genus of flies

Cacatuopyga is a genus of flies in the family Mydidae. They have a distribution in the Indomalayan Realm.

== Species ==
- Cacatuopyga auriculosa (Séguy, 1934) - Vietnam
- Cacatuopyga basifascia Walker, 1859 - Sulawesi
- Cacatuopyga carmichaeli (Brunetti, 1913) - Northeast India
- Cacatuopyga fruhstorferi (Wulp, 1896) - Java
- Cacatuopyga ruficornis (Wiedemann, 1824) - Peninsular India
