= Namibimydas =

Scientific classification
- Kingdom: Animalia
- Phylum: Arthropoda
- Class: Insecta
- Order: Diptera
- Family: Mydidae
- Subfamily: Syllegomydinae
- Tribe: Halterorchini
- Genus: Namibimydas; Hesse, 1972

Type species
- Namibimydas gaerdesi Hesse, 1972

Genus of flies

Namibimydas is a genus of flies in the family Mydidae.

== Species ==
- Namibimydas gaerdesi Hesse, 1972
- Namibimydas prinsi Hesse, 1974
- Namibimydas psamminos Dikow, 2012
- Namibimydas stuckenbergi Dikow, 2012
