= Vespiodes =

Scientific classification
- Kingdom: Animalia
- Phylum: Arthropoda
- Class: Insecta
- Order: Diptera
- Family: Mydidae
- Subfamily: Syllegomydinae
- Tribe: Mydaselpidini
- Genus: Vespiodes; Hesse, 1969

Type species
- Leptomydas conopeus Sack, 1935

Genus of flies

Vespiodes is a genus of flies in the family Mydidae.

== Species ==
- Vespiodes cerioidiformis Hesse, 1969
- Vespiodes conopeus (Sack, 1935)
- Vespiodes goldingi (Béquaert, 1951)
- Vespiodes katangensis (Béquaert, 1940)
- Vespiodes leopolditertii (Béquaert, 1940)
- Vespiodes nyasae Hesse, 1969
- Vespiodes pattersoni (Béquaert, 1951)
- Vespiodes phaios Dikow, 2010
- Vespiodes rhodesiensis (Béquaert, 1951)
- Vespiodes ruficeps Hesse, 1969
