= Ceriomydas =

Scientific classification
- Kingdom: Animalia
- Phylum: Arthropoda
- Class: Insecta
- Order: Diptera
- Family: Mydidae
- Subfamily: Mydinae
- Tribe: Mydini
- Genus: Ceriomydas; Williston, 1898

Type species
- Ceriomydas fraudulentus Williston, 1898

Genus of flies

Ceriomydas is a genus of flies in the family Mydidae.

== Species ==
- Ceriomydas darlingtoni Papavero & Wilcox, 1974
- Ceriomydas fraudulentus (Williston, 1898)
- Ceriomydas fraudulentus Williston, 1898
- Ceriomydas vespoides Papavero & Wilcox, 1974
