= Paramydas =

Scientific classification
- Kingdom: Animalia
- Phylum: Arthropoda
- Class: Insecta
- Order: Diptera
- Family: Mydidae
- Subfamily: Apiophorinae
- Genus: Paramydas; Andretta, 1948

Type species
- Mydas igniticornis Bigot, 1857

Genus of flies

Paramydas is a genus of flies in the family Mydidae.

== Species ==
- Paramydas igniticornis (Bigot, 1857)
