= Megascelinae =

Scientific classification
- Kingdom: Animalia
- Phylum: Arthropoda
- Class: Insecta
- Order: Diptera
- Family: Mydidae
- Subfamily: Megascelinae

Subfamily of insects

Megascelinae is a subfamily of mydas flies in the family Mydidae.

== Genera ==
- Megascelus Philippi, 1865
- Neorhaphiomidas Norris, 1936
- Tongamya Stuckenberg, 1966
