= Julius Victor Carus =

German zoologist

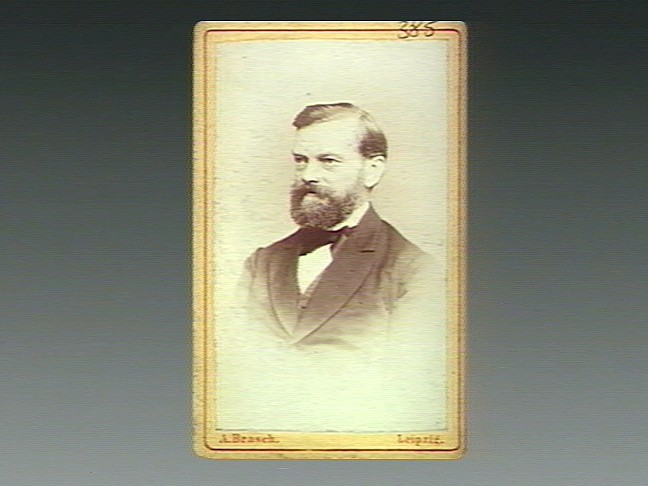
- Born: 25 July 1823; Leipzig
- Died: 10 March 1903 (aged 79); Leipzig
- Occupations: Comparative anatomist, zoologist

Julius Victor Carus (25 July 1823 – 10 March 1903) was a German zoologist, comparative anatomist and entomologist.

== Career ==
Carus was born in Leipzig. He served as curator of the Museum of Comparative Anatomy at Oxford University from 1849 to 1851, and as professor of comparative anatomy and director of the Zoological Museum at the University of Leipzig in 1853.

Carus was an early supporter of Darwinism. With Charles Darwin's approval, he became his German translator. In 1872 he published his own History of Zoology in which he criticized the inaccuracies of Pliny the Elder's work and said that the philosopher "misunderstood Aristotle.". In 1875, Carus issued a German edition of Darwin's collected works.

== Bibliography ==
(incomplete)

- 1849. Zur nähern Kenntnis des Generationswechsels (Leipzig).
- 1853. System der tierischen Morphologie.
- 1854. Über die Wertbestimmung zoologische Merkmale.
- 1857. Julius Victor Carus (dir.): Icones Zootomicae. Includes contributions from George James Allman (1812–1898), Carl Gegenbaur (1826–1903), Thomas Henry Huxley, Albert Kölliker, Heinrich Ludwig Hermann Müller (1829–1883), Max Schultze, Carl Theodor Ernst von Siebold (1804–1885) et Friedrich Stein. (Wilhelm Engelmann, Leipzig).
- 1861. Bibliotheca zoologica (Leipzig, two volumes)
- 1861. Über die Leptocephaliden. (Wilhelm Engelmann, Leipzig).
- 1863–1875 : with Wilhelm Peters (1815–1883) and Carl Eduard Adolph Gerstaecker (1828–1895) Handbuch der Zoologie (Leipzig).
- 1872. Alexander von Humboldt. Eine wissenschaftliche Biographie. (Leipzig, 3 volumes).
- 1872. with Johannes Peter Müller (1801–1858) and Charles Darwin Geschichte der Zoologie bis auf Joh. Müller und Ch. Darwin. (Münich).
- 1884. Prodromus faunae mediterraneae. volume 1, volume 2
