= Parectyphus =

Scientific classification
- Kingdom: Animalia
- Phylum: Arthropoda
- Class: Insecta
- Order: Diptera
- Family: Mydidae
- Subfamily: Ectyphinae
- Genus: Parectyphus; Hesse, 1972

Type species
- Parectyphus namibiensis Hesse, 1972

Genus of flies

Parectyphus is a genus of flies in the family Mydidae.

== Species ==
- Parectyphus namibiensis Hesse, 1972
