= Mydaselpis =

Scientific classification
- Kingdom: Animalia
- Phylum: Arthropoda
- Clade: Pancrustacea
- Class: Insecta
- Order: Diptera
- Family: Mydidae
- Subfamily: Syllegomydinae
- Tribe: Mydaselpidini
- Genus: Mydaselpis; Bezzi, 1924

Type species
- Mydaselpis peringueyi Bezzi, 1924

Genus of flies

Mydaselpis is a genus of flies in the family Mydidae.

== Species ==
- Mydaselpis ignicornis (Brunetti, 1929)
- Mydaselpis karooensis Hesse, 1969
- Mydaselpis mimeticus Hesse, 1969
- Mydaselpis ngurumani Dikow, 2010
- Mydaselpis peringueyi Bezzi, 1924
- Mydaselpis variolosus Bezzi, 1924
