= Mimadelphus =

Scientific classification
- Kingdom: Animalia
- Phylum: Arthropoda
- Class: Insecta
- Order: Diptera
- Family: Mydidae
- Subfamily: Syllegomydinae
- Tribe: Halterorchini
- Genus: Mimadelphus; Hesse, 1972

Type species
- Mimadelphus vellosus Hesse, 1972

Genus of flies

Mimadelphus is a genus of flies in the family Mydidae.

== Species ==
- Mimadelphus vellosus Hesse, 1972
