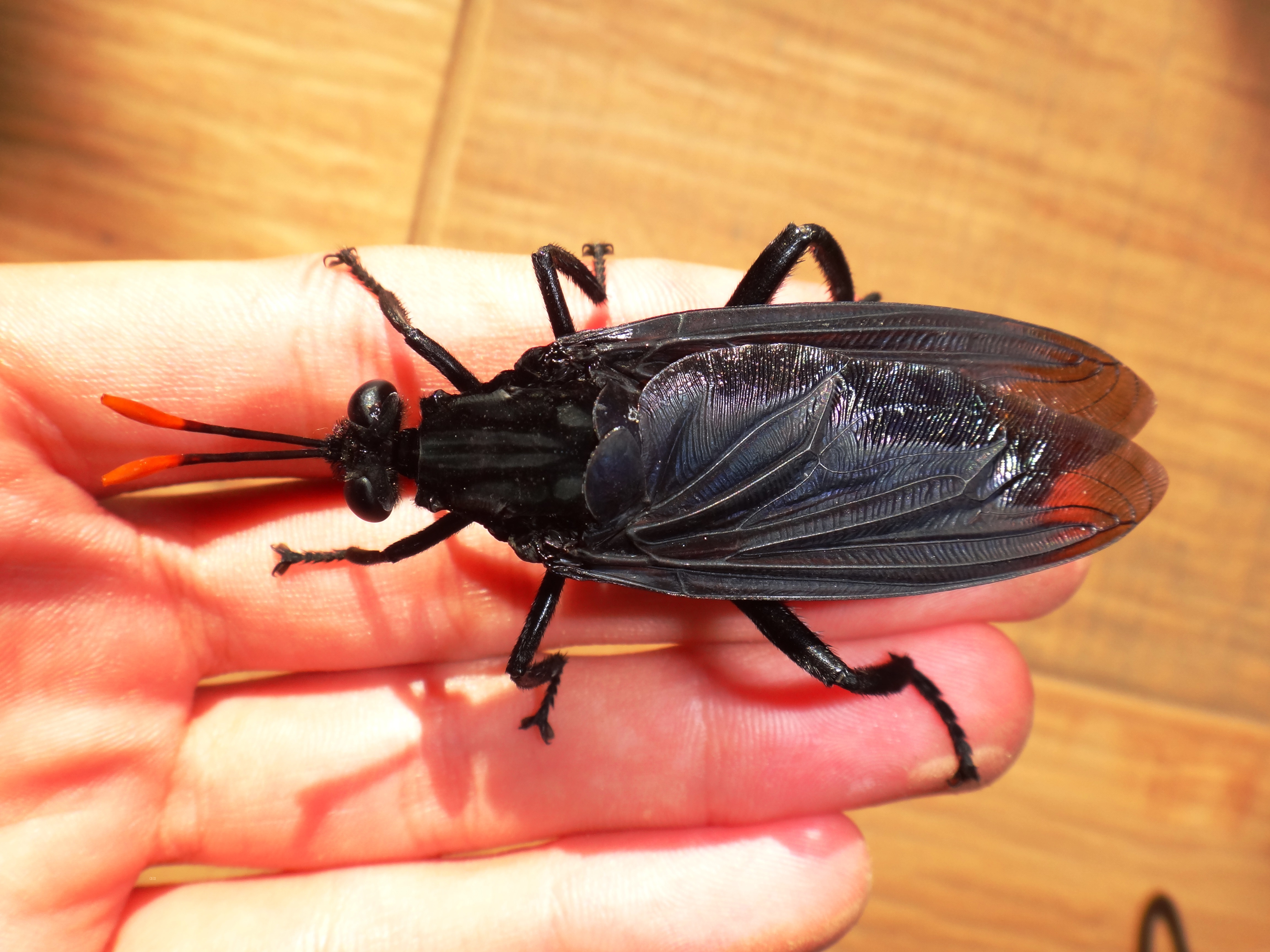
- Gauromydas heros

Scientific classification
- Kingdom: Animalia
- Phylum: Arthropoda
- Class: Insecta
- Order: Diptera
- Family: Mydidae
- Subfamily: Mydinae
- Tribe: Mydini
- Genus: Gauromydas; Papavero & Pimentel, 1989

Type species
- Mydas heros Perty, 1833

= Gauromydas =

Genus of flies

Gauromydas is a genus of flies in the family Mydidae.

== Species ==
- Gauromydas apicalis (Wiedemann, 1831)
- Gauromydas autuorii (Andretta, 1951)
- Gauromydas heros (Perty, 1833)
- Gauromydas mateus Calhau, Lamas & Nihei, 2015
- Gauromydas mystaceus (Wiedemann, 1831)
- Gauromydas papaveroi Calhau, Lamas & Nihei, 2015
