= Cacatuopyginae =

Scientific classification
- Kingdom: Animalia
- Phylum: Arthropoda
- Class: Insecta
- Order: Diptera
- Family: Mydidae
- Subfamily: Cacatuopyginae

Subfamily of insects

Cacatuopyginae is a subfamily of mydas flies in the family Mydidae.

== Genera ==
- Cacatuopyga Papavero & Wilcox, 1974
- Charimydas Bowden, 1984
