= Anomalomydas =

Scientific classification
- Kingdom: Animalia
- Phylum: Arthropoda
- Class: Insecta
- Order: Diptera
- Family: Mydidae
- Subfamily: Anomalomydinae
- Genus: Anomalomydas; Wilcox, 1974

Type species
- Miltinus mackerrasi Norris, 1938

Genus of flies

Anomalomydas is a genus of flies in the family Mydidae.

== Species ==
- Anomalomydas australicus (Paramonov, 1950)
- Anomalomydas mackerrasi (Norris, 1938)
