= Halterorchis =

Scientific classification
- Kingdom: Animalia
- Phylum: Arthropoda
- Clade: Pancrustacea
- Class: Insecta
- Order: Diptera
- Family: Mydidae
- Subfamily: Syllegomydinae
- Tribe: Halterorchini
- Genus: Halterorchis; Bezzi, 1924

Type species
- Halterorchis inermis Bezzi, 1924

Genus of flies

Halterorchis is a genus of flies in the family Mydidae.

== Species ==
- Halterorchis inermis Bezzi, 1924
- Halterorchis karooensis Hesse, 1969
