= Charimydas =

Scientific classification
- Kingdom: Animalia
- Phylum: Arthropoda
- Class: Insecta
- Order: Diptera
- Family: Mydidae
- Subfamily: Cacatuopyginae
- Genus: Charimydas; Bowden, 1984

Type species
- Charimydas decoratus Bowden, 1984

Genus of flies

Charimydas is a genus of flies in the family Mydidae.

== Species ==
- Charimydas decoratus Bowden, 1984
