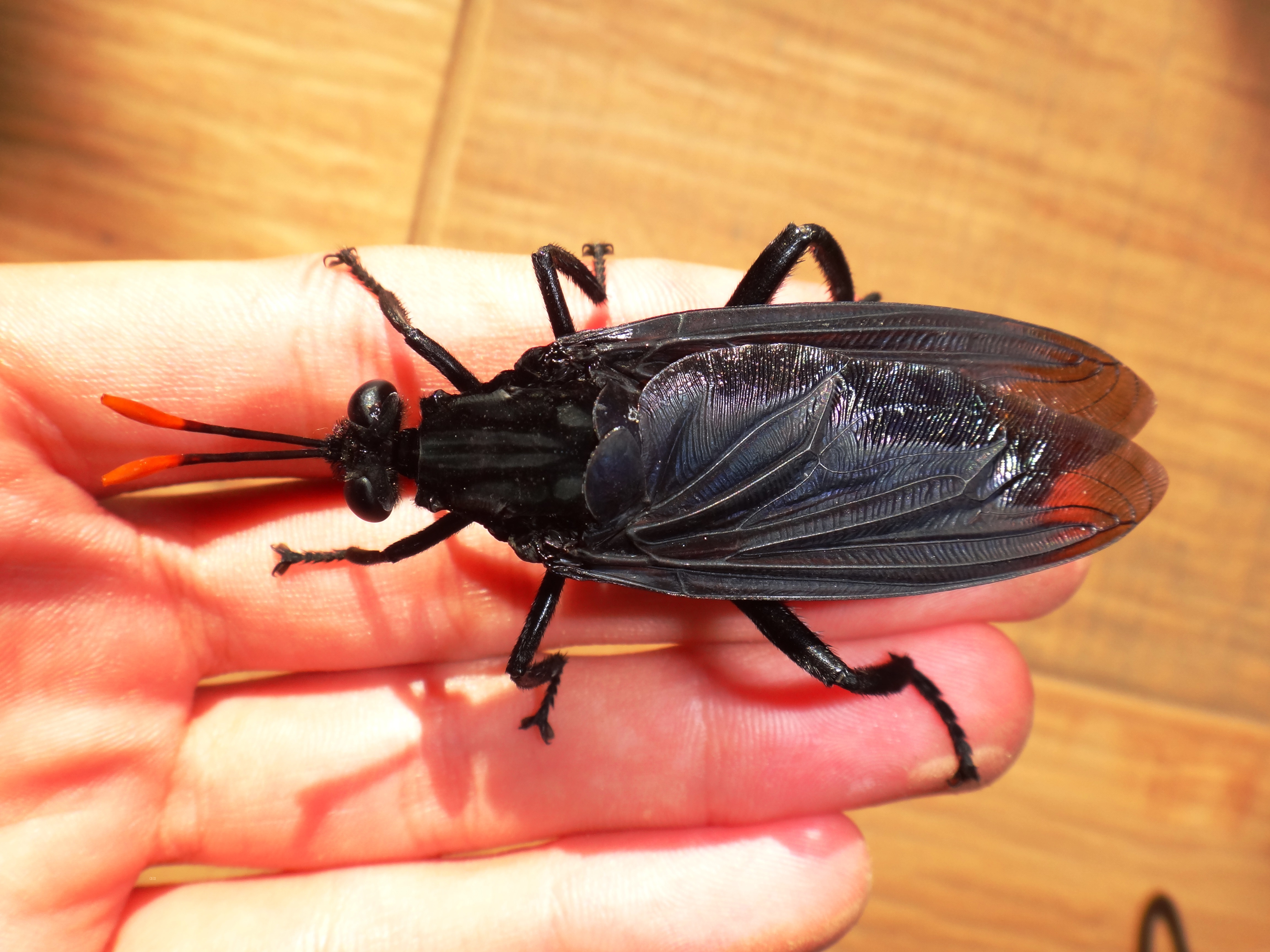
- Gauromydas heros

Scientific classification
- Kingdom: Animalia
- Phylum: Arthropoda
- Class: Insecta
- Order: Diptera
- Family: Mydidae
- Genus: Gauromydas
- Species: G. heros

Binomial name
- Gauromydas heros (Perty, 1833)

Synonyms
- Mydas heros Perty, 1833; Mydas praegrandis Austen, 1909; Gauromydas praegrandis (Austen, 1909); Gauromydas praegrandis (Austen, 1909)

= Gauromydas heros =

Species of fly

Gauromydas heros is a species of giant fly belonging to the family Mydidae. It is the largest species of the entire order of Diptera or true flies.

== Distribution ==
This species has a Neotropical distribution and is found in Brazil, Bolivia, Paraguay and also in Colombia, in the latter country two populations were detected in Villavicencio, in the Department of Meta and in Manizales, in the Department of Caldas although there is a possibility that Gauromydas heros populations of Colombia are a different species.

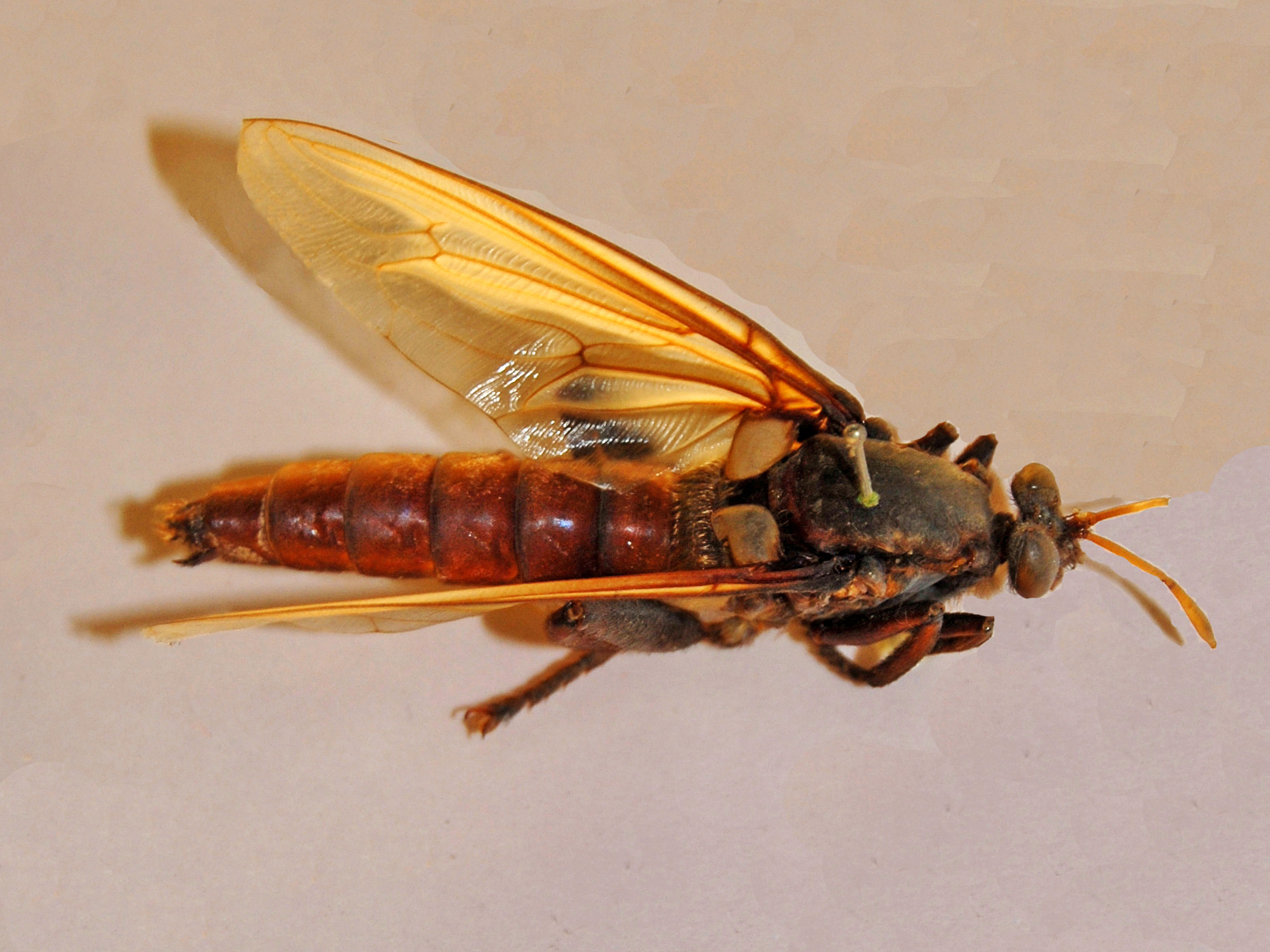
Mounted specimen

== Description ==
Gauromydas heros can reach a length of 7 centimetres (2.8 in) and a wingspan of about 10 centimetres (3.9 in). It is the largest fly known. The wing membrane is whitish, brown or orange, with a hyaline apex and a posterior margin.

== Biology ==
Adult males are flower visitors, while females do not feed at all. Larvae live in the nest of ants (Atta species), feeding on immature insects. Mature larva dig a pupation chamber in the soil, then the imago emerges.

== See also ==
- List of largest insects
