= Baliomydas =

Scientific classification
- Kingdom: Animalia
- Phylum: Arthropoda
- Class: Insecta
- Order: Diptera
- Family: Mydidae
- Subfamily: Mydinae
- Tribe: Mydini
- Genus: Baliomydas; Papavero & Pimentel, 1989

Type species
- Mydas gracilis Macquart, 1834

Genus of flies

Baliomydas is a genus of flies in the family Mydidae.

== Species ==
- Baliomydas cubana (Curran, 1951)
- Baliomydas gracilis Macquart, 1834
