= Apiophora =

Scientific classification
- Kingdom: Animalia
- Phylum: Arthropoda
- Class: Insecta
- Order: Diptera
- Family: Mydidae
- Subfamily: Apiophorinae
- Genus: Apiophora; Philippi, 1865

Type species
- Apiophora paulseni Philippi, 1865

Genus of flies

Apiophora is a genus of flies in the family Mydidae.

== Species ==
- Apiophora elvirae Reed & Ruiz, 1942
- Apiophora paulseni Philippi, 1865
- Apiophora quadricinctata Artigas & Palma, 1979
- Apiophora rubrocincta (Blanchard, 1854)
