= Dolichogaster =

Scientific classification
- Kingdom: Animalia
- Phylum: Arthropoda
- Class: Insecta
- Order: Diptera
- Family: Mydidae
- Subfamily: Mydinae
- Tribe: Dolichogastrini
- Genus: Dolichogaster; Macquart, 1848

Type species
- Mydas brevicornis Wiedemann, 1821

Genus of flies

Dolichogaster is a genus of flies in the family Mydidae.

== Species ==
- Dolichogaster brevicornis (Wiedemann, 1821)
