= Rhopaliinae =

Scientific classification
- Kingdom: Animalia
- Phylum: Arthropoda
- Class: Insecta
- Order: Diptera
- Family: Mydidae
- Subfamily: Rhopaliinae

Subfamily of insects

Rhopaliinae is a subfamily of mydas flies in the family Mydidae.

== Genera ==
- Perissocerus Gerstaecker, 1868
- Pseudorhopalia Wilcox & Papavero, 1971
- Rhopalia Macquart, 1838
- Rhopaliana Séguy, 1934
