= Rhopalia (fly) =

Scientific classification
- Kingdom: Animalia
- Phylum: Arthropoda
- Class: Insecta
- Order: Diptera
- Family: Mydidae
- Subfamily: Rhopaliinae
- Genus: Rhopalia; Macquart, 1838

Type species
- Rhopalia olivieri Macquart, 1838

Genus of flies

Rhopalia is a genus of flies in the family Mydidae.

== Species ==
- Rhopalia annulata Sack, 1934
- Rhopalia bequaerti Lyneborg, 1970
- Rhopalia berlandi Séguy, 1949
- Rhopalia cincta Sack, 1934
- Rhopalia efflatouni Béquaert, 1961
- Rhopalia gyps Bowden, 1987
- Rhopalia iranensis Béquaert, 1961
- Rhopalia oldroydi Lyneborg, 1970
- Rhopalia olivieri Macquart, 1838
- Rhopalia perarmata Séguy, 1941
- Rhopalia spinolae Macquart, 1838
- Rhopalia tristis Séguy, 1928
