= Neorhaphiomidas =

Scientific classification
- Kingdom: Animalia
- Phylum: Arthropoda
- Class: Insecta
- Order: Diptera
- Family: Mydidae
- Subfamily: Megascelinae
- Genus: Neorhaphiomidas; Norris, 1936

Type species
- Neorhaphiomidas hardyi Norris, 1936

Genus of flies

Neorhaphiomidas is a genus of flies in the family Mydidae.

== Species ==
- Neorhaphiomidas hardyi Norris, 1936
- Neorhaphiomidas inermis Paramonov, 1961
- Neorhaphiomidas norrisi Paramonov, 1953
- Neorhaphiomidas pallida Paramonov, 1953
- Neorhaphiomidas pinguis Norris, 1936
- Neorhaphiomidas setosa Paramonov, 1953
- Neorhaphiomidas villosa Paramonov, 1953
