= Heteromydas =

Scientific classification
- Kingdom: Animalia
- Phylum: Arthropoda
- Class: Insecta
- Order: Diptera
- Family: Mydidae
- Subfamily: Ectyphinae
- Genus: Heteromydas; Hardy, 1944

Type species
- Heteromydas bicolor Hardy, 1945

Genus of flies

Heteromydas is a genus of flies in the family Mydidae.

== Species ==
- Heteromydas bicolor Hardy, 1945
- Heteromydas chrysites (Osten Sacken, 1886)
