= Chrysomydas =

Scientific classification
- Kingdom: Animalia
- Phylum: Arthropoda
- Class: Insecta
- Order: Diptera
- Family: Mydidae
- Subfamily: Mydinae
- Tribe: Mydini
- Genus: Chrysomydas; Papavero & Pimentel, 1989

Type species
- Mydas nitidulus Olivier, 1811

Genus of flies

Chrysomydas is a genus of flies in the family Mydidae.

== Species ==
- Chrysomydas nitidulus Olivier, 1811
- Chrysomydas phoenix Calhau & Lamas, 2019
