= Halterorchini =

Scientific classification
- Kingdom: Animalia
- Phylum: Arthropoda
- Class: Insecta
- Order: Diptera
- Family: Mydidae
- Subfamily: Syllegomydinae
- Tribe: Halterorchini

Tribe of flies

Halterorchini is a tribe of flies in the family Mydidae.

== Genera ==
- Halterorchis Bezzi, 1924
- Mimadelphus Hesse, 1972
- Namibimydas Hesse, 1972
- Nothomydas Hesse, 1969
