= Tongamya =

Scientific classification
- Kingdom: Animalia
- Phylum: Arthropoda
- Class: Insecta
- Order: Diptera
- Family: Mydidae
- Subfamily: Megascelinae
- Genus: Tongamya; Stuckenberg, 1966

Type species
- Tongamya miranda Stuckenberg, 1966

Genus of flies

Tongamya is a genus of flies in the family Mydidae.

== Species ==
- Tongamya miranda Stuckenberg, 1966
- Tongamya stuckenbergi Irwin & Wiegmann, 2001
