= Afromydas =

Scientific classification
- Kingdom: Animalia
- Phylum: Arthropoda
- Class: Insecta
- Order: Diptera
- Family: Mydidae
- Subfamily: Syllegomydinae
- Tribe: Mydaselpidini
- Genus: Afromydas; Béquaert

Type species
- Afromydas guichardi Béquaert, 1961

Genus of flies

Afromydas is a genus of flies in the family Mydidae.

== Species ==
- Afromydas guichardi Béquaert, 1961
