= Cretomydas =

Scientific classification
- Kingdom: Animalia
- Phylum: Arthropoda
- Class: Insecta
- Order: Diptera
- Family: Mydidae
- Subfamily: Diochlistinae
- Genus: †Cretomydas; Willkommen, 2007

Genus of flies

Cretomydas is an extinct genus of flies in the family Mydidae.

== Species ==
- †Cretomydas santanensis Willkommen, 2007
