= Megascelus =

Scientific classification
- Kingdom: Animalia
- Phylum: Arthropoda
- Class: Insecta
- Order: Diptera
- Family: Mydidae
- Subfamily: Megascelinae
- Genus: Megascelus; Philippi, 1865

Type species
- Megascelus nigricornis Philippi, 1865

Genus of flies

Megascelus is a genus of flies in the family Mydidae.

== Species ==
- Megascelus albovillosus Artigas, 1973
- Megascelus melanoproctus Artigas, 1970
- Megascelus nigricornis Philippi, 1865
- Megascelus nigrovillosus Artigas, 1970
- Megascelus palmicola Artigas, 1970
