= Opomydas =

Scientific classification
- Kingdom: Animalia
- Phylum: Arthropoda
- Class: Insecta
- Order: Diptera
- Family: Mydidae
- Subfamily: Ectyphinae
- Genus: Opomydas; Curran, 1934

Type species
- Ectyphus limbatus Williston, 1886

Genus of flies

Opomydas is a genus of flies in the family Mydidae.

== Species ==
- Opomydas limbatus (Williston, 1886)
- Opomydas townsendi (Williston, 1898)
