= Messiasia =

- Messiasia perpolita

Scientific classification
- Kingdom: Animalia
- Phylum: Arthropoda
- Clade: Pancrustacea
- Class: Insecta
- Order: Diptera
- Family: Mydidae
- Subfamily: Mydinae
- Tribe: Messiasiini
- Genus: Messiasia; Andretta, 1951

Type species
- Messiasia carrerai Andretta, 1951

Genus of flies

Messiasia is a genus of flies in the family Mydidae.

== Species ==
- Messiasia californica (Cole, 1969)
- Messiasia carioca Wilcox, 1975
- Messiasia carrerai Andretta, 1951
- Messiasia dalcyana Andretta, 1951
- Messiasia decor (Osten Sacken, 1886)
- Messiasia lanei Andretta, 1951
- Messiasia mocoronga Wilcox, 1975
- Messiasia notospila (Wiedemann, 1828)
- Messiasia painteri Wilcox, 1975
- Messiasia penai Wilcox, 1975
- Messiasia pertenuis (Johnson, 1926)
- Messiasia punicea (Séguy, 1928)
- Messiasia uaupes Wilcox, 1975
- Messiasia virgata (Wiedemann, 1830)
- Messiasia wilcoxi Papavero, 1976
- Messiasia yacochuya Wilcox, 1975
- Messiasia zikani Andretta, 1951
