= Stratiomydas =

Scientific classification
- Kingdom: Animalia
- Phylum: Arthropoda
- Class: Insecta
- Order: Diptera
- Family: Mydidae
- Subfamily: Mydinae
- Tribe: Mydini
- Genus: Stratiomydas; Papavero & Pimentel, 1989

Type species
- Mydas rufiventris Macquart, 1850

Genus of flies

Stratiomydas is a genus of flies in the family Mydidae.

== Species ==
- Stratiomydas colimas Wilcox, Papavero & Pimentel, 1989
- Stratiomydas nayaritae Wilcox, Papavero & Pimentel, 1989
- Stratiomydas rufiventris (Macquart, 1850)
- Stratiomydas wygodzinskyi Wilcox, Papavero & Pimentel, 1989
