= Mapinguari (fly) =

Scientific classification
- Kingdom: Animalia
- Phylum: Arthropoda
- Class: Insecta
- Order: Diptera
- Family: Mydidae
- Subfamily: Mydinae
- Tribe: Mydini
- Genus: Mapinguari; Wilcox, 1974

Type species
- Midas politus Wiedemann, 1828

Genus of flies

Mapinguari is a genus of flies in the family Mydidae.

== Species ==
- Mapinguari polita (Wiedemann, 1828)
- Mapinguari uai Calhau, Lamas & Nihei, 2016
