= Nothomydas =

Scientific classification
- Kingdom: Animalia
- Phylum: Arthropoda
- Class: Insecta
- Order: Diptera
- Family: Mydidae
- Subfamily: Syllegomydinae
- Tribe: Halterorchini
- Genus: Nothomydas; Hesse, 1969

Type species
- Nothomydas gariepinus Hesse, 1969

Genus of flies

Nothomydas is a genus of flies in the family Mydidae.

== Species ==
- Nothomydas aquilonius Dikow, 2012
- Nothomydas gariepinus Hesse, 1969
- Nothomydas namaquensis Hesse, 1972
- Nothomydas picketti Dikow, 2012
