= Rhopaliana =

Scientific classification
- Kingdom: Animalia
- Phylum: Arthropoda
- Class: Insecta
- Order: Diptera
- Family: Mydidae
- Subfamily: Rhopaliinae
- Genus: Rhopaliana; Séguy, 1934

Type species
- Rhopaliana rufithorax 1934

Genus of flies

Rhopaliana is a genus of flies in the family Mydidae.

== Species ==
- Rhopaliana rufithorax Séguy, 1934
