= Haplomydas =

Scientific classification
- Kingdom: Animalia
- Phylum: Arthropoda
- Clade: Pancrustacea
- Class: Insecta
- Order: Diptera
- Family: Mydidae
- Subfamily: Syllegomydinae
- Genus: Haplomydas; Bezzi, 1924

Type species
- Haplomydas crassipes Bezzi, 1924

Synonyms
- Heleomydas Séguy, 1929

Genus of flies

Haplomydas is a genus of flies in the family Mydidae.

== Species ==
- Haplomydas crassipes Bezzi, 1924
