= Oreomydas =

Scientific classification
- Kingdom: Animalia
- Phylum: Arthropoda
- Class: Insecta
- Order: Diptera
- Family: Mydidae
- Subfamily: Syllegomydinae
- Genus: Oreomydas; Hesse, 1969

Type species
- Leptomydas luctuosus Bezzi, 1924)

Genus of flies

Oreomydas is a genus of flies in the family Mydidae.

== Species ==
- Oreomydas luctuosus (Bezzi, 1924)
