= Eremohaplomydas =

Scientific classification
- Kingdom: Animalia
- Phylum: Arthropoda
- Class: Insecta
- Order: Diptera
- Family: Mydidae
- Subfamily: Syllegomydinae
- Genus: Eremohaplomydas; Bequaert, 1960

Type species
- Eremohaplomydas desertorum Bequaert, 1960

Genus of flies

Eremohaplomydas is a genus of flies in the family Mydidae.

== Species ==
- Eremohaplomydas desertorum Béquaert, 1960
- Eremohaplomydas gobabebensis Boschert & Dikow, 2022
- Eremohaplomydas stomachoris Boschert & Dikow, 2022
- Eremohaplomydas whartoni Boschert & Dikow, 2022
