= Namadytes =

Scientific classification
- Kingdom: Animalia
- Phylum: Arthropoda
- Class: Insecta
- Order: Diptera
- Family: Mydidae
- Subfamily: Syllegomydinae
- Genus: Namadytes; Hesse, 1969

Type species
- Namadytes vansoni Hesse, 1969

Synonyms
- Namamydas Hesse, 1969

Genus of flies

Namadytes is a genus of flies in the family Mydidae.

== Species ==
- Namadytes cimbebasiensis Hesse, 1972
- Namadytes maculiventris (Hesse, 1969)
- Namadytes prozeskyi Hesse, 1969
- Namadytes vansoni Hesse, 1969
