= Notosyllegomydas =

Scientific classification
- Kingdom: Animalia
- Phylum: Arthropoda
- Class: Insecta
- Order: Diptera
- Family: Mydidae
- Subfamily: Syllegomydinae
- Genus: Notosyllegomydas; Hesse, 1969

Type species
- Syllegomydas brincki Béquaert, 1960

Genus of flies

Notosyllegomydas is a genus of flies in the family Mydidae.

== Species ==
- Notosyllegomydas brincki (Béquaert, 1960)
