= Nomoneuroides =

Scientific classification
- Kingdom: Animalia
- Phylum: Arthropoda
- Class: Insecta
- Order: Diptera
- Family: Mydidae
- Subfamily: Syllegomydinae
- Genus: Nomoneuroides; Hesse, 1969

Type species
- Nomoneuroides natalensis Hesse, 1969

Genus of flies

Nomoneuroides is a genus of flies in the family Mydidae.

== Species ==
- Nomoneuroides brunneus Hesse, 1969
- Nomoneuroides melas Hesse, 1969
- Nomoneuroides natalensis Hesse, 1969
