= Heteroleptomydas =

Scientific classification
- Kingdom: Animalia
- Phylum: Arthropoda
- Class: Insecta
- Order: Diptera
- Family: Mydidae
- Subfamily: Syllegomydinae
- Genus: Heteroleptomydas; Bequaert, 1963

Type species
- Heteroleptomydas conopsoides Bequaert, 1963

Genus of flies

Heteroleptomydas is a genus of flies in the family Mydidae.

== Species ==
- Heteroleptomydas conopsoides Béquaert, 1963
