= Lachnocorynus =

Scientific classification
- Kingdom: Animalia
- Phylum: Arthropoda
- Class: Insecta
- Order: Diptera
- Family: Mydidae
- Subfamily: Syllegomydinae
- Genus: Lachnocorynus; Hesse, 1969

Type species
- Lachnocorynus chobeensis Hesse, 1969

Genus of flies

Lachnocorynus is a genus of flies in the family Mydidae.

== Species ==
- Lachnocorynus chobeensis Hesse, 1969
- Lachnocorynus kochi Hesse, 1969
- Lachnocorynus stenocephalus Boschert & Dikow, 2022
