= Midacritus =

Scientific classification
- Kingdom: Animalia
- Phylum: Arthropoda
- Class: Insecta
- Order: Diptera
- Family: Mydidae
- Subfamily: Apiophorinae
- Genus: Midacritus; Séguy, 1938

Type species
- Midacritus stuardoanus Séguy, 1938

Genus of flies

Midacritus is a genus of flies in the family Mydidae.

== Species ==
- Midacritus kuscheli Séguy, 1951
- Midacritus stuardoanus Séguy, 1938
- Midacritus wagenkechti Reed & Ruiz, 1942
