= Mahafalymydas =

Scientific classification
- Kingdom: Animalia
- Phylum: Arthropoda
- Class: Insecta
- Order: Diptera
- Family: Mydidae
- Subfamily: Syllegomydinae
- Genus: Mahafalymydas; Carr & Irwin, 2005

Type species
- Mahafalymydas wiegmanni Kondratieff, Carr & Irwin, 2005

Genus of flies

Mahafalymydas is a genus of flies in the family Mydidae.

== Species ==
- Mahafalymydas tuckeri Kondratieff, Carr & Irwin, 2005
- Mahafalymydas wiegmanni Kondratieff, Carr & Irwin, 2005
