= Nomoneura =

Scientific classification
- Kingdom: Animalia
- Phylum: Arthropoda
- Clade: Pancrustacea
- Class: Insecta
- Order: Diptera
- Family: Mydidae
- Subfamily: Syllegomydinae
- Genus: Nomoneura; Bezzi, 1924

Type species
- Midas fasciatus Bezzi, 1924

Genus of flies

Nomoneura is a genus of flies in the family Mydidae.

== Species ==
- Nomoneura barbertonensis Hesse, 1969
- Nomoneura bellardi (Bertoloni, 1861)
- Nomoneura bezzii Hesse, 1975
- Nomoneura caffra Hesse, 1969
- Nomoneura paradoxa Bezzi, 1924
- Nomoneura violacea Hesse, 1969
