= Diochlistinae =

Scientific classification
- Kingdom: Animalia
- Phylum: Arthropoda
- Class: Insecta
- Order: Diptera
- Family: Mydidae
- Subfamily: Diochlistinae

Subfamily of insects

Diochlistinae is a subfamily of mydas flies in the family Mydidae.

== Genera ==
- †Cretomydas Willkommen, 2007
- Diochlistus Gerstaecker, 1868
- Mitrodetus Gerstaecker, 1868
