= Ectyphinae =

Scientific classification
- Kingdom: Animalia
- Phylum: Arthropoda
- Class: Insecta
- Order: Diptera
- Family: Mydidae
- Subfamily: Ectyphinae

Subfamily of insects

Ectyphinae is a subfamily of mydas flies in the family Mydidae. There are at least four genera in Ectyphinae.

== Genera ==
These genera belong to the subfamily Ectyphinae:

- Ectyphus Gerstaecker, 1868 (South Africa)
- Heteromydas Hardy, 1945 (Mexico and the United States)
- Opomydas Curran, 1934 (Mexico and the United States)
- Parectyphus Hesse, 1972 (Namibia)
