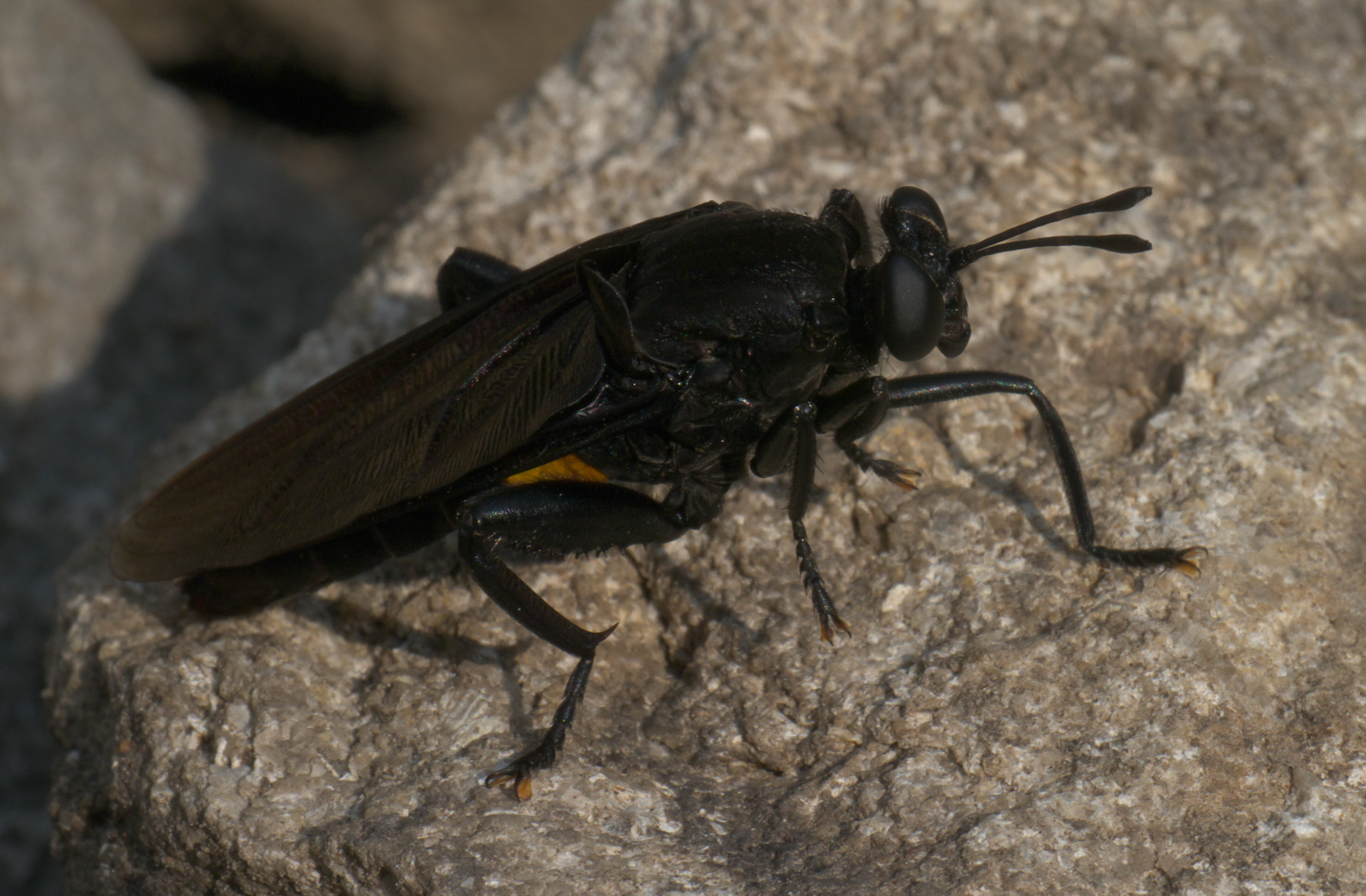
- Mydas clavatus

Scientific classification
- Kingdom: Animalia
- Phylum: Arthropoda
- Class: Insecta
- Order: Diptera
- Family: Mydidae
- Subfamily: Mydinae

= Mydinae =

Subfamily of flies

Mydinae is a subfamily of mydas flies in the family Mydidae.

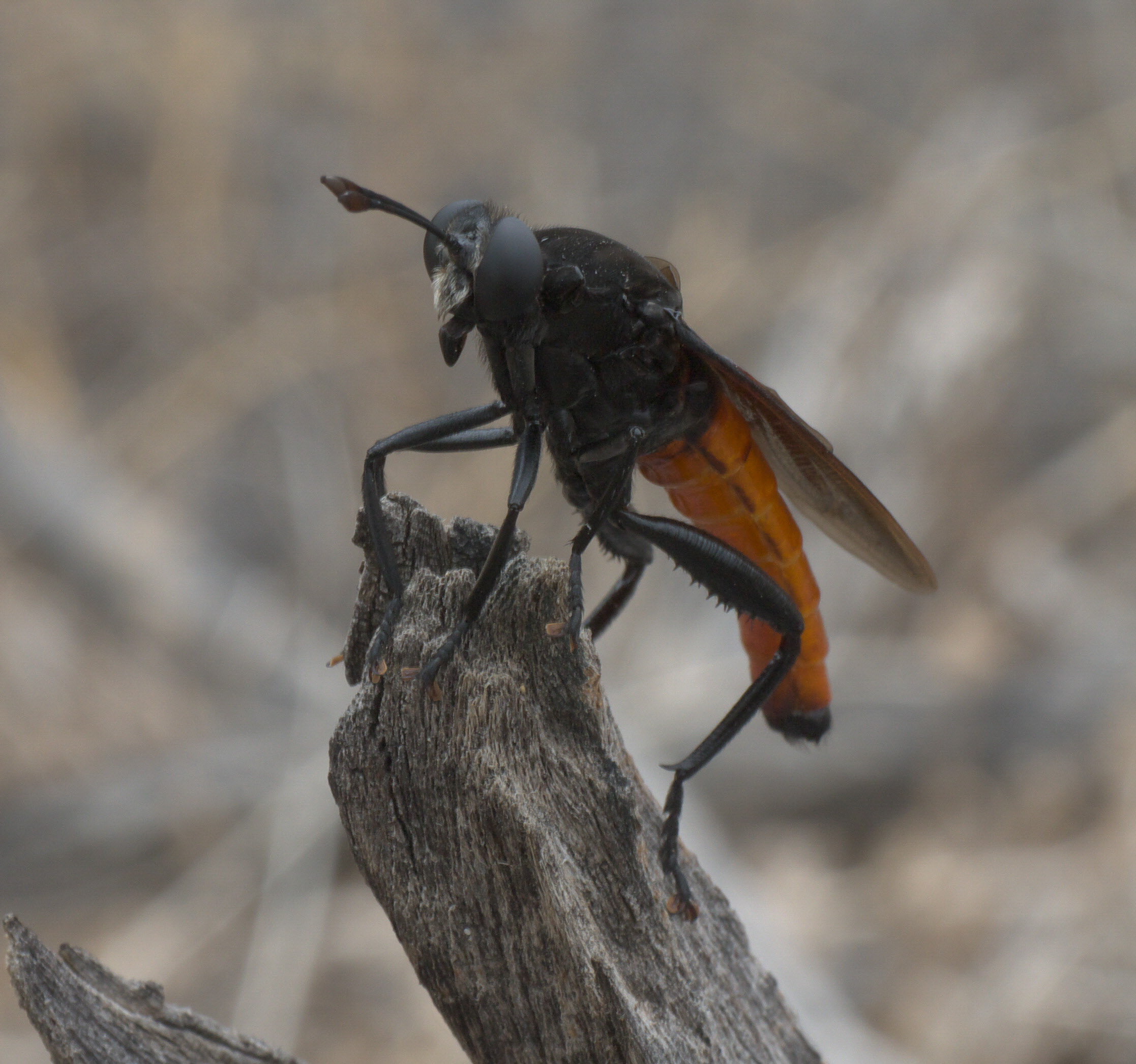
Mydas ventralis

== Tribes & Genera ==
Dolichogastrini

- Dolichogaster Wilcox, Papavero and Pimentel, 1989

Messiasiini

- Messiasia Andretta, 1951

Mydini

- Baliomydas Papavero & Pimentel, 1989
- Belemiana Pontia, 2020
- Ceriomydas Papavero & Pimentel, 1989
- Chrysomydas Papavero & Pimentel, 1989
- Gauromydas Papavero & Pimentel, 1989
- Mapinguari Wilcox, 1989
- Mydas Fabricius, 1794
- Protomydas Wilcox, Papavero and Pimentel, 1989
- Stratiomydas Wilcox, Papavero and Pimentel, 1989

Phyllomydini

- Phyllomydas Bigot, 1880
