= Mydini =

Scientific classification
- Kingdom: Animalia
- Phylum: Arthropoda
- Class: Insecta
- Order: Diptera
- Family: Mydidae
- Subfamily: Mydinae
- Tribe: Mydini

Genus of flies

Mydini is a tribe of flies in the family Mydidae.

== Genera ==
- Baliomydas Papavero & Pimentel, 1989
- Ceriomydas Papavero & Pimentel, 1989
- Chrysomydas Papavero & Pimentel, 1989
- Gauromydas Papavero & Pimentel, 1989
- Mapinguari Wilcox, 1989
- Mydas Fabricius, 1794
- Protomydas Wilcox, Papavero and Pimentel, 1989
- Stratiomydas Wilcox, Papavero and Pimentel, 1989
