= Syllegomydinae =

Scientific classification
- Kingdom: Animalia
- Phylum: Arthropoda
- Class: Insecta
- Order: Diptera
- Family: Mydidae
- Subfamily: Syllegomydinae

Subfamily of insects

Syllegomydinae is a subfamily of mydas flies in the family Mydidae.

== Tribes and genera ==
Cephalocerini

- Cephalocera Latreille, 1829

Halterorchini

- Halterorchis Bezzi, 1924
- Mimadelphus Hesse, 1972
- Namibimydas Hesse, 1972
- Nothomydas Hesse, 1969

Mydaselpidini

- Afromydas Bequaert, 1961
- Mydaselpis Bezzi, 1924
- Vespiodes Hesse, 1969

Syllegomydini

- Afroleptomydas Bequaert, 1961
- Agaperemius Hesse, 1969
- Arenomydas Hesse, 1969
- Eremohaplomydas Bequaert, 1960
- Haplomydas Bezzi, 1924
- Heteroleptomydas Bequaert, 1963
- Lachnocorynus Hesse, 1969
- Mahafalymydas Carr & Irwin, 2005
- Namadytes Hesse, 1969
- Nomoneura Bezzi, 1924
- Nomoneuroides Hesse, 1969
- Notosyllegomydas Hesse, 1969
- Oreomydas Hesse, 1969
- Syllegomydas Becker, 1906
