= Carl Eduard Adolph Gerstaecker =

German zoologist and entomologist (1828–1895)

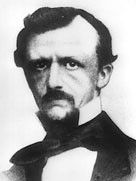
Carl Eduard Adolph Gerstaecker

Carl Eduard Adolph Gerstaecker (30 August 1828 – 20 June 1895) was a German zoologist, entomologist and professor at the University of Berlin and afterwards the University of Greifswald.

== Biography ==
Gerstaecker was born in Berlin, where he studied medicine and natural sciences, receiving a PhD in 1855 as a student of Johann Christoph Friedrich Klug. In 1856 he obtained his habilitation for zoology, and soon afterwards, became a curator at the Zoological Museum of Humboldt University. In 1864 he began work as a lecturer at the Landwirtschaftlichen Lehranstalt (Agricultural Educational Facility) in Berlin. In 1874, he became an associate professor for zoology at the University of Berlin, and in 1876, a professor of zoology at the University of Greifswald. He died in Greifswald.

== Works ==
- Monographie der Endomychiden (1858) – Monograph on Endomychidae.
- Handbuch der Zoologie (with Wilhelm Peters und Julius Victor Carus), Leipzig (1863-1875).
- Carus, Julius Victor; Gerstaecker, C.E.A., eds. (1863). Handbuch der zoologie. Zweiter Band. Leipzig: Engelmann. (Arthropoda)
- Arthropoda, in Klassen und Ordnungen des Thierreichs, (Section Arthropoda, in classes and orders of the Animals) 1866–93.
- Beitrag zur Insekten-Fauna von Zanzibar. Parts [1]-3. (1866) – Contribution to the insect-fauna of Zanzibar.
- Das Skelet des Döglings Hyperoodon Rostratus (Pont.) Ein Beitrag zur Osteologie der Cetaceen und zur vergleichenden Morphologie der Wirbelsäule, (1887) – The skeleton of the northern bottlenose whale. A contribution to the osteology of cetaceans and the comparative morphology of the spinal column.
- 'On The Geographical Distribution and Varieties of the Honey-Bee, with Remarks upon the Exotic Honeybees of the Old World, The Annals and Magazine of Natural History, Zoology, Botany, and Geology (1863) vol.11, no.3, pp. 270–283.
