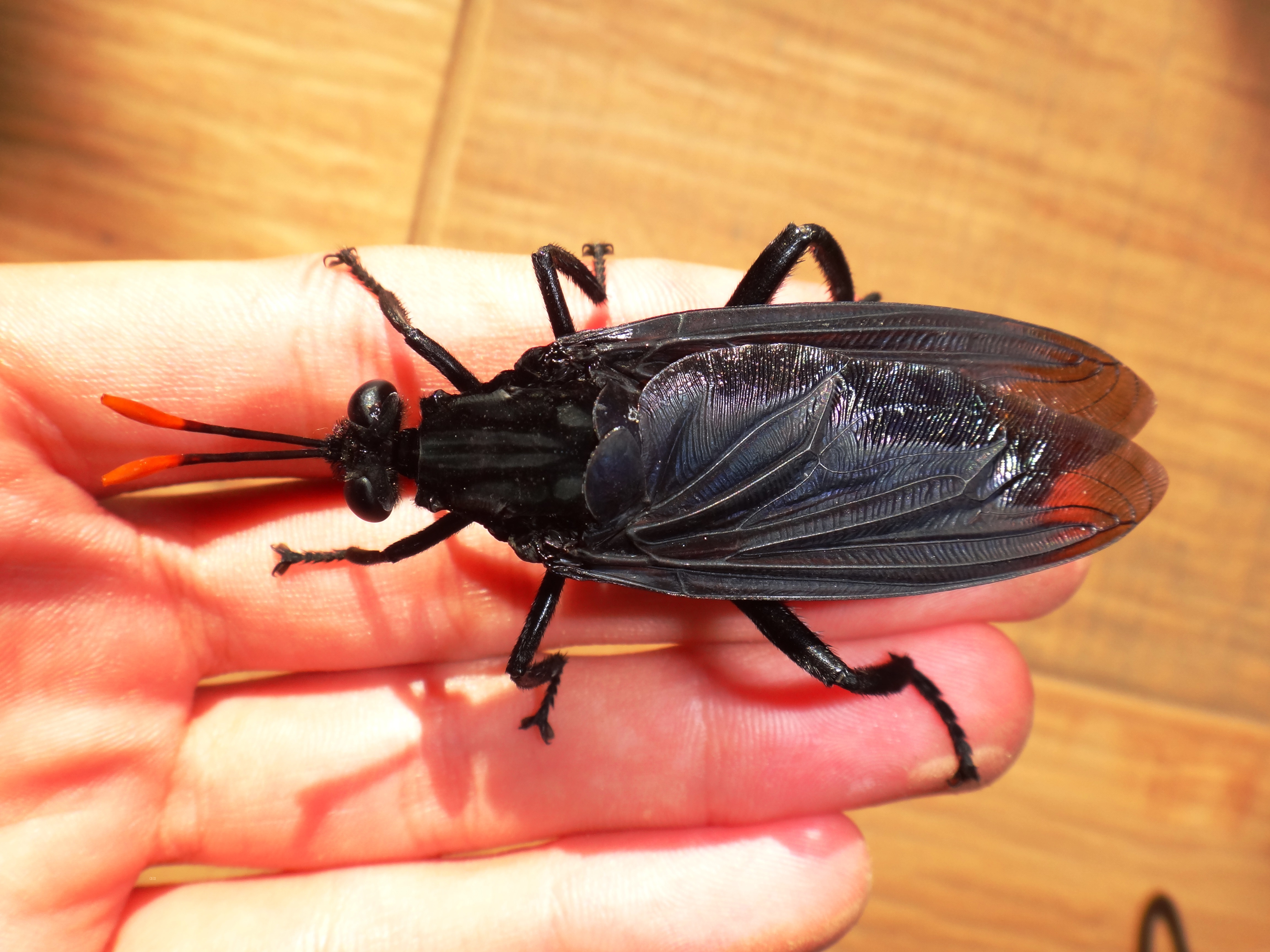
- Gauromydas heros

Scientific classification
- Kingdom: Animalia
- Phylum: Arthropoda
- Class: Insecta
- Order: Diptera
- Superfamily: Asiloidea
- Family: Mydidae; Latreille, 1809

Subfamilies
- Anomalomydinae; Apiophorinae; Cacatuopyginae; Diochlistinae; Ectyphinae; Leptomydinae; Megascelinae; Mydinae; Rhaphiomidinae; Rhopaliinae; Syllegomydinae

= Mydas fly =

Mydas flies Temporal range: Aptian–Recent

Family of flies

Wing venation of Mydas sp.

The Mydidae (sometimes misspelled as "Mydaidae"), or Mydas flies, are a cosmopolitan family of flies. It is a small family, with about 471 species described. They are generally large in size, including the largest known fly, Gauromydas heros (syn. Mydas heros). Many of the species, in addition to their large size, are mimics of stinging hymenopterans, especially wasps.

Most mydids are found in arid and semiarid regions of the world, but they are also found in other habitats. Mydidae are most diverse in southern Africa, but many species have also been described from North America, Chile, and Australia.

== Biology ==
Little is known about their biology, though Zikan reported the larvae of Gauromydas heros live in the subterranean detritus "pans" of Atta ants in southern Brazil, where they appear to be feeding on detritivorous Dynastinae (Coelosis spp.) larvae. In the U.S., Mydas brunneus, Mydas clavatus, and Mydas tibialis larvae are predatory on deadwood-feeding scarab beetle larvae (Osmoderma spp.) and can be found in standing and downed trees with extensive heart rot. Others (e.g. Mydas maculiventris) are subterranean and feed on "white grubs" (Scarabaeidae: genus Phyllophaga) that attack the roots of grasses and could be potential biocontrol agents of white grubs in sod production areas. Larvae typically take two or three years to mature.

Adults of several species are avid flower visitors and act as pollinating agents. Rattlesnake master (Eryngium yuccifolium) is a favorite nectar source in the Midwest. They are infrequently encountered as the adult lifespan can be quite short.

== Description ==
Mydids are medium-sized to very large flies (9–60 mm in body length). The abdomen is long and cylindrical in section. It is slightly tapered apically in the male, and usually widest at segment four in the female. The second segment of the antenna forms a club. Mydids are sparsely pilose, and lack bristles except on the legs. The hind leg is much longer and stronger than both the middle leg and the fore leg and the hind femur is usually swollen and bears ventral spines. The hind tibia has an apical spur or bristles. The wings are long, and narrow to wide. Most of the veins end in the upper margin before the apex.

== Classification ==
The classification of the family has changed fairly recently, in 1996, with the inclusion of a few genera that were previously placed in the family Apioceridae. Apiocerids have long been given the common name "flower-loving flies", but the only group of "flower-loving flies" that actually visit flowers were transferred to the Mydidae. Among the genera transferred is Rhaphiomidas, which includes one of the few Diptera on the United States' Endangered Species List, the Delhi Sands flower-loving fly (Rhaphiomidas terminatus abdominalis).

== Evolutionary history ==
The oldest known member of the family is Cretomydas from the Early Cretaceous (Aptian) Crato Formation of Brazil. The genus appears to have close affinites to the subfamily Diochlistinae, suggesting a Cretaceous diversification for the family.

== Species lists ==
- West Palaearctic including Russia
- Australasian/Oceanian
- Nearctic
- Japan
- World list

== Genera ==
- Afroleptomydas Bequaert, 1961
- Afromydas Bequaert, 1961
- Agaperemius Hesse, 1969
- Anomalomydas Papavero & Wilcox, 1974
- Apiophora Philippi, 1865
- Arenomydas Hesse, 1969^{c g}
- Baliomydas Papavero & Pimentel, 1989
- Belemiana Pontia, 2020
- Cacatuopyga Papavero & Wilcox, 1974
- Cephalocera^{c g}
- Cephalocerodes Hesse, 1969^{c g}
- Ceriomydas Williston, 1898
- Charimydas^{c g}
- Chrysomydas Papavero & Pimentel, 1989
- Diochlistus Gerstaecker, 1868^{c g}
- Dolichogaster Macquart, 1848
- Ectyphus Gerstaecker, 1868^{c g}
- Eremohaplomydas^{c g}
- Eremomidas^{c g}
- Eumydas^{c g}
- Gauromydas Papavero & Pimentel, 1989
- Halterorchis Bezzi, 1924
- Haplomydas^{c g}
- Hessemydas Carr & Irwin, 2005
- Heteroleptomydas^{c g}
- Heteromydas Hardy, 1944
- Hispanomydas^{c g}
- Lachnocorynus Hesse, 1969^{c g}
- Leptomydas Gerstaecker, 1868^{c g}
- Mahafalymydas^{c g}
- Mapinguari Papavero & Wilcox, 1974
- Megascelus^{c g}
- Messiasia d'Andretta, 1951^{i c g b}
- Midacritus^{c g}
- Miltinus Gerstaecker, 1868^{c g}
- Mimadelphus Hesse, 1972
- Mitrodetus Gerstaecker, 1868^{c g}
- Mydas Fabricius, 1794
- Mydaselpis^{c g}
- Namadytes Hesse, 1969^{c g}
- Namibimydas Hesse, 1972
- Nemomydas Curran, 1934^{i c g b}
- Neolaparopsis Hesse, 1969^{c g}
- Neorhaphiomidas^{c g}
- Nomoneura^{c g}
- Nomoneuroides Hesse, 1969^{c g}
- Nothomydas Hesse, 1969
- Notosyllegomydas Hesse, 1969^{c g}
- Opomydas Curran, 1934
- Oreomydas Hesse, 1969^{c g}
- Paramydas^{c g}
- Parectyphus^{c g}
- Perissocerus Gerstaecker, 1868^{c g}
- Phyllomydas Bigot, 1880
- Plyomydas Papavero, 1971
- Protomydas Papavero & Pimentel, 1989
- Pseudonomoneura Bequaert, 1961
- Pseudorhopalia Wilcox & Papavero, 1971
- Rhaphiomidas Osten Sacken, 1877
- Rhopalia^{c g}
- Rhopaliana^{c g}
- Stratiomydas Papavero & Pimentel, 1989
- Syllegomydas^{c g}
- Tongamya^{c g}
- Vespiodes Hesse, 1969^{c g}

Data sources: i = ITIS, c = Catalogue of Life, g = GBIF, b = Bugguide.net
