= Tanybria =

Scientific classification
- Kingdom: Animalia
- Phylum: Arthropoda
- Clade: Pancrustacea
- Class: Insecta
- Order: Coleoptera
- Suborder: Polyphaga
- Infraorder: Cucujiformia
- Family: Chrysomelidae
- Subfamily: Eumolpinae
- Tribe: Bromiini
- Genus: Tanybria; Selman, 1963

Type species
- Brevicolaspis aurichalcea J. Thomson, 1858

Synonyms
- Eubrachis Burgeon, 1940 (nec Baly, 1878 nec Dejean, 1836)

Genus of leaf beetles from Africa

Tanybria is a genus of leaf beetles in the subfamily Eumolpinae. It is distributed in Africa.

Tanybria was originally known as Eubrachis, in the sense of Louis Burgeon, who gave a description of the genus in 1940. However, this name was unavailable, as it was preoccupied by Eubrachis as first used by Dejean in his catalogue in 1836 (as an unnecessary replacement name for Pseudocolaspis), and Eubrachis in the sense of Joseph Sugar Baly in 1878 (now a synonym of Macrocoma). Because of this, Burgeon's Eubrachis was renamed to Tanybria by Brian J. Selman in 1963.

== Species ==
- Tanybria apicalis (Jacoby, 1881)
- Tanybria aurichalcea (J. Thomson, 1858)
- Tanybria bipilis (Burgeon, 1940)
- Tanybria costata (Jacoby, 1898)
- Tanybria cupreomarginata (Jacoby, 1895)
- Tanybria eximia (Baly, 1877)
- Tanybria kivuensis (Burgeon, 1940)
- Tanybria spinipes (Baly, 1878)
- Tanybria timiliatha (J. Thomson, 1858)
- Tanybria tuberculata (Jacoby, 1903)
