= Pseudocolaspis maynei =

Scientific classification
- Kingdom: Animalia
- Phylum: Arthropoda
- Clade: Pancrustacea
- Class: Insecta
- Order: Coleoptera
- Suborder: Polyphaga
- Infraorder: Cucujiformia
- Family: Chrysomelidae
- Genus: Pseudocolaspis
- Species: P. maynei

Binomial name
- Pseudocolaspis maynei Burgeon, 1940

Species of beetle

Pseudocolaspis maynei is a species of leaf beetle. It was first described by the Belgian entomologist Louis Burgeon in 1940 from Bamania, the Democratic Republic of the Congo.

The holotype measures about 4 mm (0.16 in) in length.
