= Pseudocolaspis chrysites =

Scientific classification
- Kingdom: Animalia
- Phylum: Arthropoda
- Clade: Pancrustacea
- Class: Insecta
- Order: Coleoptera
- Suborder: Polyphaga
- Infraorder: Cucujiformia
- Family: Chrysomelidae
- Genus: Pseudocolaspis
- Species: P. chrysites

Binomial name
- Pseudocolaspis chrysites Gerstaecker, 1871

Synonyms
- Pseudocolaspis chrysites mosambica Kolbe, 1897; Pseudocolaspis chrysites mosambica var. aurichalcea Kolbe, 1897; Pseudocolaspis chrysites mosambica var. cuprea Kolbe, 1897; Pseudocolaspis chrysites mosambica var. obscura Kolbe, 1897; Pseudocolaspis chrysites mosambica var. violacea Kolbe, 1897; Pseudocolaspis chrysites ab. kolbei Clavareau, 1914

Species of beetle

Pseudocolaspis chrysites (or Macrocoma chrysites) is a species of leaf beetle from East Africa and the Arabian Peninsula. It was first described by the German entomologist Carl Eduard Adolph Gerstaecker in 1871. The species is sometimes included within the genus Macrocoma, for example in the Catalogue of Palaearctic Coleoptera.

== Distribution ==
P. chrysites is reported from the Democratic Republic of the Congo, Yemen, Ethiopia, Tanzania and Mozambique. Reports of the species from the Arabian Peninsula are probably erroneous.
