= Pseudocolaspis garambaensis =

Scientific classification
- Kingdom: Animalia
- Phylum: Arthropoda
- Clade: Pancrustacea
- Class: Insecta
- Order: Coleoptera
- Suborder: Polyphaga
- Infraorder: Cucujiformia
- Family: Chrysomelidae
- Genus: Pseudocolaspis
- Species: P. garambaensis

Binomial name
- Pseudocolaspis garambaensis Selman, 1972

Species of beetle

Pseudocolaspis garambaensis is a species of leaf beetle. It was described by Brian J. Selman in 1972 from the Garamba National Park, in the north-eastern Democratic Republic of the Congo. Its host plant is Combretum binderianum (=Combretum collinum binderianum).

The holotype measures about 3 mm (0.12 in) in length.
