= Pseudocolaspis rigida =

Scientific classification
- Kingdom: Animalia
- Phylum: Arthropoda
- Clade: Pancrustacea
- Class: Insecta
- Order: Coleoptera
- Suborder: Polyphaga
- Infraorder: Cucujiformia
- Family: Chrysomelidae
- Genus: Pseudocolaspis
- Species: P. rigida

Binomial name
- Pseudocolaspis rigida Baly, 1877

Species of beetle

Pseudocolaspis rigida is a species of leaf beetle of Cameroon, the Democratic Republic of the Congo, Senegal, and Ivory Coast, described by Joseph Sugar Baly in 1877.
