= Pseudocolaspis villiersi =

Scientific classification
- Kingdom: Animalia
- Phylum: Arthropoda
- Clade: Pancrustacea
- Class: Insecta
- Order: Coleoptera
- Suborder: Polyphaga
- Infraorder: Cucujiformia
- Family: Chrysomelidae
- Genus: Pseudocolaspis
- Species: P. villiersi

Binomial name
- Pseudocolaspis villiersi Pic, 1953

Species of beetle

Pseudocolaspis villiersi is a species of leaf beetle of Senegal, described by Maurice Pic in 1953.
