= Tanybria aurichalcea =

Scientific classification
- Kingdom: Animalia
- Phylum: Arthropoda
- Clade: Pancrustacea
- Class: Insecta
- Order: Coleoptera
- Suborder: Polyphaga
- Infraorder: Cucujiformia
- Family: Chrysomelidae
- Genus: Tanybria
- Species: T. aurichalcea

Binomial name
- Tanybria aurichalcea (J. Thomson, 1858)

Synonyms
- Brevicolapsis aurichalcea J. Thomson, 1858; Eubrachis aurichalcea (J. Thomson, 1858); Pseudocolaspis aurichalcea (J. Thomson, 1858)

Species of beetle

Tanybria aurichalcea is a species of leaf beetle of Gabon, the Republic of the Congo and the Democratic Republic of the Congo, described by James Thomson in 1858.
