= Pseudocolaspis cupreofemorata =

Scientific classification
- Kingdom: Animalia
- Phylum: Arthropoda
- Clade: Pancrustacea
- Class: Insecta
- Order: Coleoptera
- Suborder: Polyphaga
- Infraorder: Cucujiformia
- Family: Chrysomelidae
- Genus: Pseudocolaspis
- Species: P. cupreofemorata

Binomial name
- Pseudocolaspis cupreofemorata Jacoby, 1900

Species of beetle

Pseudocolaspis cupreofemorata is a species of leaf beetle found in central and southern Africa. It was first described from Harare by Martin Jacoby in 1900.

== Subspecies ==
There are two subspecies of P. cupreofemorata:

- Pseudocolaspis cupreofemorata cupreofemorata Jacoby, 1900 – Zimbabwe, Democratic Republic of the Congo, Rwanda, Zambia
- Pseudocolaspis cupreofemorata overlaeti Burgeon, 1940 – Democratic Republic of the Congo
