= Pseudocolaspis sericea =

Scientific classification
- Kingdom: Animalia
- Phylum: Arthropoda
- Clade: Pancrustacea
- Class: Insecta
- Order: Coleoptera
- Suborder: Polyphaga
- Infraorder: Cucujiformia
- Family: Chrysomelidae
- Genus: Pseudocolaspis
- Species: P. sericea

Binomial name
- Pseudocolaspis sericea Weise, 1910

Species of beetle

Pseudocolaspis sericea is a species of leaf beetle of Tanzania and the Democratic Republic of the Congo. It was first described from Dar es Salaam by Julius Weise in 1910.
