= Tanybria timiliatha =

Scientific classification
- Kingdom: Animalia
- Phylum: Arthropoda
- Clade: Pancrustacea
- Class: Insecta
- Order: Coleoptera
- Suborder: Polyphaga
- Infraorder: Cucujiformia
- Family: Chrysomelidae
- Genus: Tanybria
- Species: T. timiliatha

Binomial name
- Tanybria timiliatha (J. Thomson, 1858)

Synonyms
- Eubrachis timiliathus (J. Thomson, 1858); Pseudocolaspis timiliathus J. Thomson, 1858

Species of beetle

Tanybria timiliatha is a species of leaf beetle of Gabon and the Democratic Republic of the Congo, described by James Thomson in 1858.
