= Pseudocolaspis severini =

Scientific classification
- Kingdom: Animalia
- Phylum: Arthropoda
- Clade: Pancrustacea
- Class: Insecta
- Order: Coleoptera
- Suborder: Polyphaga
- Infraorder: Cucujiformia
- Family: Chrysomelidae
- Genus: Pseudocolaspis
- Species: P. severini

Binomial name
- Pseudocolaspis severini Jacoby, 1900

Species of beetle

Pseudocolaspis severini is a species of leaf beetle of the Democratic Republic of the Congo, described by Martin Jacoby in 1900.
