= Tanybria kivuensis =

Scientific classification
- Kingdom: Animalia
- Phylum: Arthropoda
- Clade: Pancrustacea
- Class: Insecta
- Order: Coleoptera
- Suborder: Polyphaga
- Infraorder: Cucujiformia
- Family: Chrysomelidae
- Genus: Tanybria
- Species: T. kivuensis

Binomial name
- Tanybria kivuensis (Burgeon, 1940)

Synonyms
- Eubrachis kivuensis Burgeon, 1940

Species of beetle

Tanybria kivuensis is a species of leaf beetle of the Democratic Republic of the Congo. It was first described by the Belgian entomologist Louis Burgeon in 1940.
