= Pseudocolaspis azurea =

Scientific classification
- Kingdom: Animalia
- Phylum: Arthropoda
- Clade: Pancrustacea
- Class: Insecta
- Order: Coleoptera
- Suborder: Polyphaga
- Infraorder: Cucujiformia
- Family: Chrysomelidae
- Genus: Pseudocolaspis
- Species: P. azurea

Binomial name
- Pseudocolaspis azurea Marshall, 1865

Species of beetle

Pseudocolaspis azurea is a species of leaf beetle of Senegal, described by Thomas Ansell Marshall in 1865.
