= Pseudocolaspis femorata =

Scientific classification
- Kingdom: Animalia
- Phylum: Arthropoda
- Clade: Pancrustacea
- Class: Insecta
- Order: Coleoptera
- Suborder: Polyphaga
- Infraorder: Cucujiformia
- Family: Chrysomelidae
- Genus: Pseudocolaspis
- Species: P. femorata

Binomial name
- Pseudocolaspis femorata Baly, 1878

Species of beetle

Pseudocolaspis femorata is a species of leaf beetle of South Africa and the Democratic Republic of the Congo. It was first described by Joseph Sugar Baly in 1878.
