= Pseudocolaspis coerulea =

Scientific classification
- Kingdom: Animalia
- Phylum: Arthropoda
- Clade: Pancrustacea
- Class: Insecta
- Order: Coleoptera
- Suborder: Polyphaga
- Infraorder: Cucujiformia
- Family: Chrysomelidae
- Genus: Pseudocolaspis
- Species: P. coerulea

Binomial name
- Pseudocolaspis coerulea Laporte, 1833

Species of beetle

Pseudocolaspis coerulea is a species of leaf beetle of Senegal, described by François-Louis Laporte in 1833.
