= Pseudocolaspis metallica =

Scientific classification
- Kingdom: Animalia
- Phylum: Arthropoda
- Clade: Pancrustacea
- Class: Insecta
- Order: Coleoptera
- Suborder: Polyphaga
- Infraorder: Cucujiformia
- Family: Chrysomelidae
- Genus: Pseudocolaspis
- Species: P. metallica

Binomial name
- Pseudocolaspis metallica Laporte, 1833

Species of beetle

Pseudocolaspis metallica is a species of leaf beetle of the Democratic Republic of the Congo and Senegal, described by François-Louis Laporte in 1833.
