= Tanybria costata =

Scientific classification
- Kingdom: Animalia
- Phylum: Arthropoda
- Clade: Pancrustacea
- Class: Insecta
- Order: Coleoptera
- Suborder: Polyphaga
- Infraorder: Cucujiformia
- Family: Chrysomelidae
- Genus: Tanybria
- Species: T. costata

Binomial name
- Tanybria costata (Jacoby, 1898)

Synonyms
- Eubrachis costata (Jacoby, 1898); Pseudocolaspis costata Jacoby, 1898

Species of beetle

Tanybria costata is a species of leaf beetle of Cameroon and the Democratic Republic of the Congo, described by Martin Jacoby in 1898.
