= Pseudocolaspis tuberculicollis =

Scientific classification
- Kingdom: Animalia
- Phylum: Arthropoda
- Clade: Pancrustacea
- Class: Insecta
- Order: Coleoptera
- Suborder: Polyphaga
- Infraorder: Cucujiformia
- Family: Chrysomelidae
- Genus: Pseudocolaspis
- Species: P. tuberculicollis

Binomial name
- Pseudocolaspis tuberculicollis Jacoby, 1893

Species of beetle

Pseudocolaspis tuberculicollis is a species of leaf beetle of Gabon and the Democratic Republic of the Congo. It was first described by Martin Jacoby in 1893.
