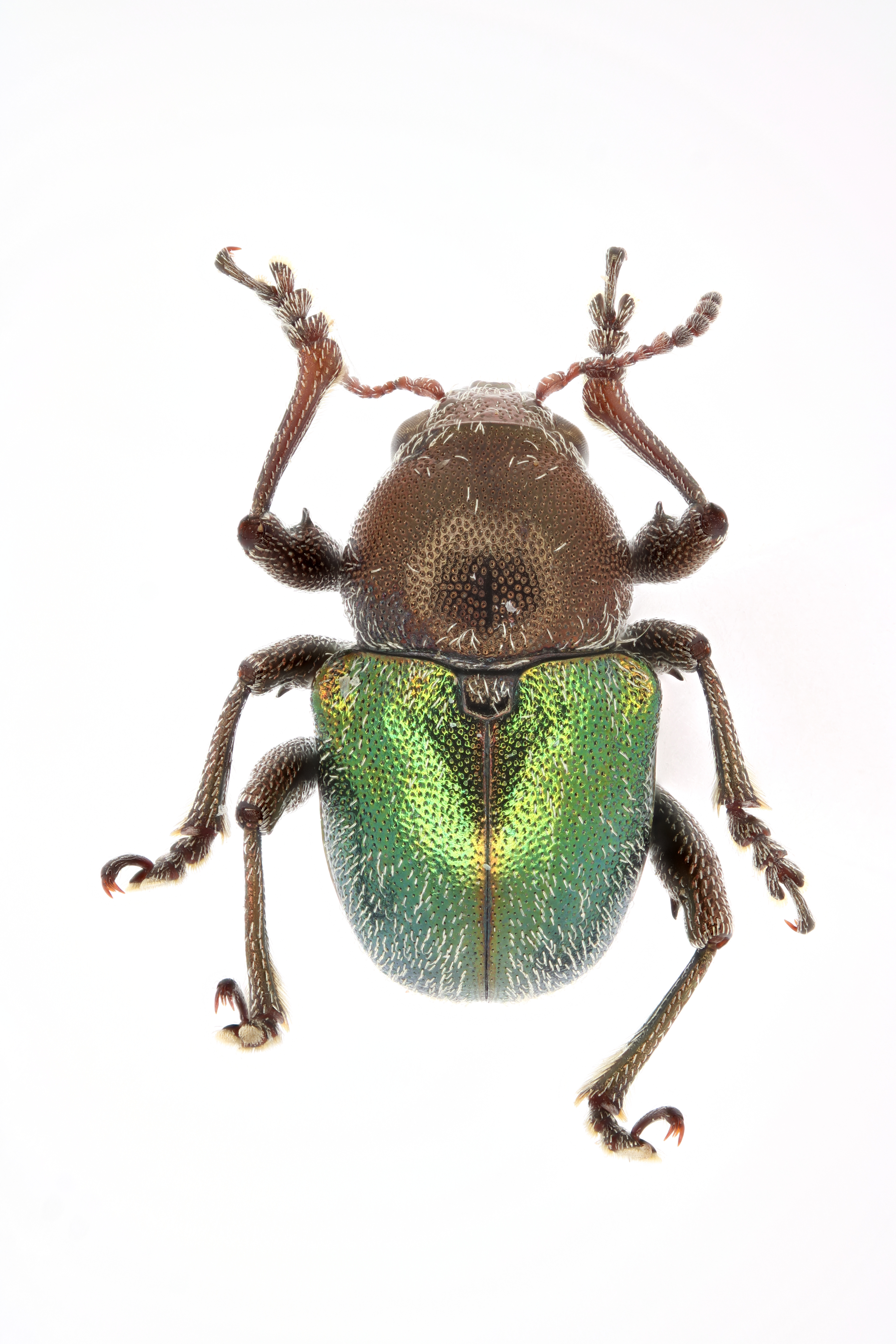
- Pseudocolaspis sp. near metallica; Guinea

Scientific classification
- Kingdom: Animalia
- Phylum: Arthropoda
- Clade: Pancrustacea
- Class: Insecta
- Order: Coleoptera
- Suborder: Polyphaga
- Infraorder: Cucujiformia
- Family: Chrysomelidae
- Subfamily: Eumolpinae
- Tribe: Bromiini
- Genus: Pseudocolaspis; Laporte, 1833

Type species
- Pseudocolaspis coerulea Laporte, 1833

Synonyms
- Eubrachis Dejean, 1836; Eubrachys Monrós & Bechyné, 1956 (misspelling)

= Pseudocolaspis =

Genus of leaf beetles from Africa

Pseudocolaspis is a genus of leaf beetles in the subfamily Eumolpinae. It contains about 80 species, which are found in tropical Africa.

== Species ==
- Pseudocolaspis albertiana Burgeon, 1940
- Pseudocolaspis albopilosa Gestro, 1895
- Pseudocolaspis albostriata Jacoby, 1886
- Pseudocolaspis alluaudi Pic, 1940
- Pseudocolaspis auroscutata Gestro, 1895
- Pseudocolaspis azurea Marshall, 1865
- Pseudocolaspis bicoloripes Pic, 1939
- Pseudocolaspis brachiata Lefèvre, 1890
- Pseudocolaspis brevesetosa Pic, 1939
- Pseudocolaspis chrysites Gerstaecker, 1871
- Pseudocolaspis coerulea Laporte, 1833
- Pseudocolaspis crampeli Pic, 1940
- Pseudocolaspis cribripes Gestro, 1895 (possibly synonym of P. tridentifera Gestro)
- Pseudocolaspis cupreofemorata Jacoby, 1900
  - Pseudocolaspis cupreofemorata cupreofemorata Jacoby, 1900
  - Pseudocolaspis cupreofemorata overlaeti Burgeon, 1940
- Pseudocolaspis cyanella Burgeon, 1940
- Pseudocolaspis cynoides (Burgeon, 1940) (erroneously regarded as Scelodonta by Selman, 1972)
- Pseudocolaspis diversepubens Pic, 1939
- Pseudocolaspis diversesculpta Pic, 1940
- Pseudocolaspis duvivieri Jacoby, 1903
- Pseudocolaspis favareli Pic, 1938
- Pseudocolaspis femorata Baly, 1878
- Pseudocolaspis fortidens Berti & Rapilly, 1973
- Pseudocolaspis fulgidipes Ancey, 1883
- Pseudocolaspis gangalaensis Selman, 1972
- Pseudocolaspis garambaensis Selman, 1972
- Pseudocolaspis gibbicollis Burgeon, 1940
- Pseudocolaspis gracilipes Lefèvre, 1890
- Pseudocolaspis hottentota Lefèvre, 1890
- Pseudocolaspis impressipennis Pic, 1940
- Pseudocolaspis inimvuaensis Selman, 1972
- Pseudocolaspis insignis Lefèvre, 1890
- Pseudocolaspis intermedia Burgeon, 1940
- Pseudocolaspis irregularis Pic, 1953 (possibly to move to genus Tanybria)
- Pseudocolaspis isoensis Selman, 1972
- Pseudocolaspis laeta Weise, 1909
- Pseudocolaspis lansbergi Lefèvre, 1890
- Pseudocolaspis lateralis Jacoby, 1898
- Pseudocolaspis laticollis Jacoby, 1898
- Pseudocolaspis lindneri Karsch, 1882
- Pseudocolaspis longithorax Pic, 1951
- Pseudocolaspis mabangaensis Selman, 1972
- Pseudocolaspis maynei Burgeon, 1940
- Pseudocolaspis metallica Laporte, 1833
- Pseudocolaspis minima Pic, 1939
- Pseudocolaspis minuta Pic, 1939
- Pseudocolaspis minutuloides Burgeon, 1940
- Pseudocolaspis mombonensis Weise, 1906
- Pseudocolaspis motoensis Burgeon, 1940
- Pseudocolaspis murrayi Baly, 1860
- Pseudocolaspis nobilis Weise, 1906
- Pseudocolaspis obscura Schaufuss, 1871 (possibly to move to other genus)
- Pseudocolaspis pachnephora Fairmaire, 1887
- Pseudocolaspis pedestris Lefèvre, 1884
- Pseudocolaspis pseudosetulosa Burgeon, 1940
- Pseudocolaspis punctatolineata (J. Thomson, 1858)
- Pseudocolaspis pygmaea Burgeon, 1940
- Pseudocolaspis rigida Baly, 1877
- Pseudocolaspis robustipes Pic, 1939
- Pseudocolaspis ruficornis Pic, 1951
- Pseudocolaspis rufimembris Pic, 1939
- Pseudocolaspis rufitarsis Burgeon, 1940
- Pseudocolaspis sacra Lopatin, 1983
- Pseudocolaspis saegeri Selman, 1972
- Pseudocolaspis semipurpurea Marshall, 1865
- Pseudocolaspis semipurpurea Pic, 1939 (junior homonym of semipurpurea Marshall)
- Pseudocolaspis sericata Marshall, 1865
- Pseudocolaspis sericea Weise, 1910
- Pseudocolaspis servula Marshall, 1865
- Pseudocolaspis setulosa Lefèvre, 1886
- Pseudocolaspis severini Jacoby, 1900
- Pseudocolaspis splendens Burgeon, 1940
- Pseudocolaspis subdentata Pic, 1939
- Pseudocolaspis substriata Weise, 1904
- Pseudocolaspis sulcatipennis Pic, 1940
- Pseudocolaspis tibialis Schaufuss, 1871
- Pseudocolaspis tridentifera Gestro, 1895
- Pseudocolaspis tuberculata Jacoby, 1903
- Pseudocolaspis tuberculicollis Jacoby, 1893
- Pseudocolaspis uelensis Burgeon, 1940
- Pseudocolaspis utukuruensis Selman, 1972
- Pseudocolaspis vanderijsti Burgeon, 1940
- Pseudocolaspis variegata Lefèvre, 1890
- Pseudocolaspis villiersi Pic, 1953
- Pseudocolaspis viridana Lefèvre, 1890
- Pseudocolaspis wittei Burgeon, 1942
