= Nemomydas brachyrhynchus =

Scientific classification
- Kingdom: Animalia
- Phylum: Arthropoda
- Class: Insecta
- Order: Diptera
- Family: Mydidae
- Subfamily: Leptomydinae
- Genus: Nemomydas
- Species: N. brachyrhynchus

Binomial name
- Nemomydas brachyrhynchus (Osten Sacken, 1886)

Synonyms
- Leptomydas brachyrhynchus Osten Sacken, 1886

Species of fly

Nemomydas brachyrhynchus is a species of mydas flies in the family Mydidae.

== Distribution ==
Mexico.
