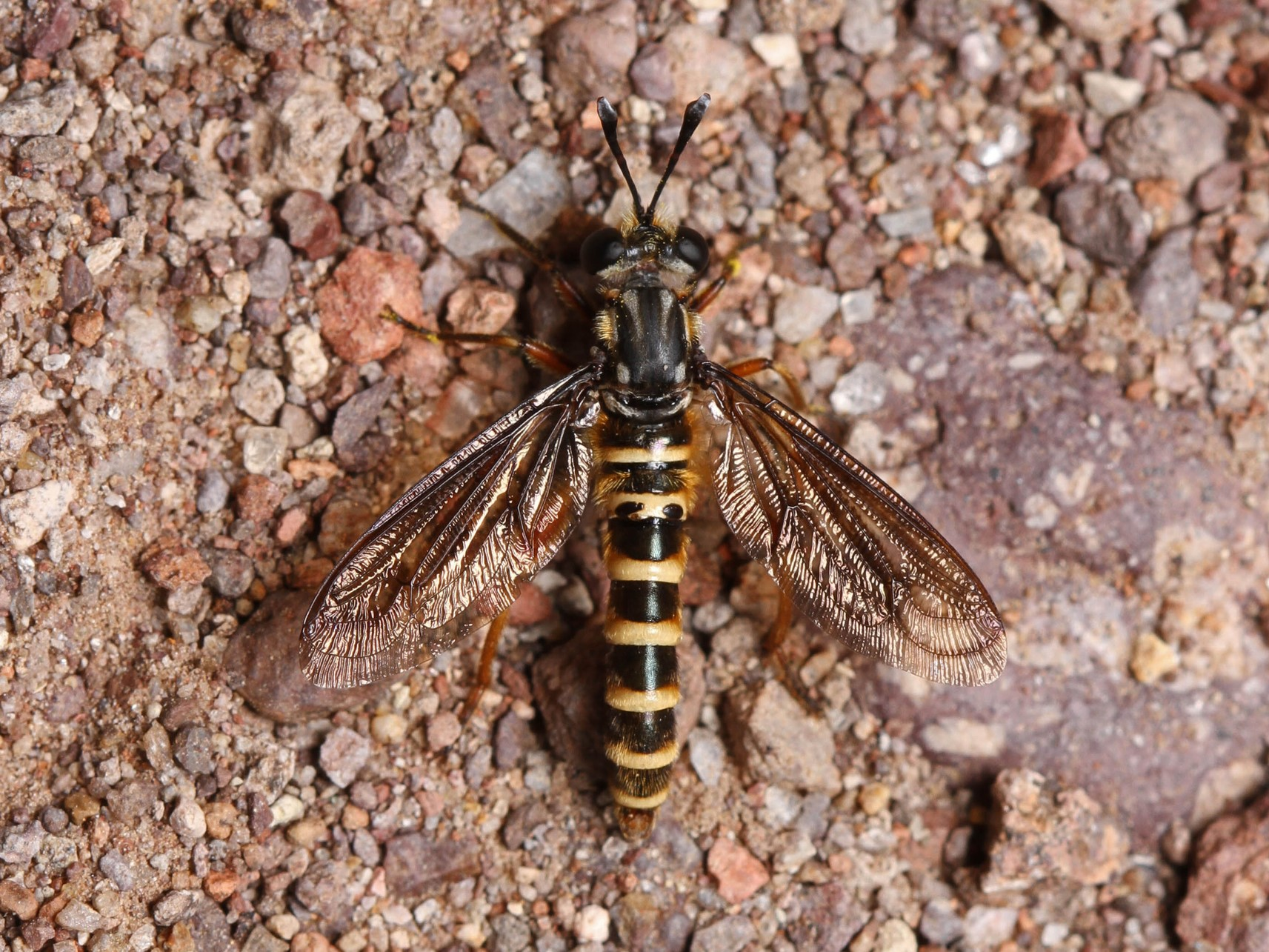

Scientific classification
- Kingdom: Animalia
- Phylum: Arthropoda
- Class: Insecta
- Order: Diptera
- Family: Mydidae
- Subfamily: Leptomydinae
- Genus: Nemomydas
- Species: N. venosus

Binomial name
- Nemomydas venosus (Loew, 1866)

Synonyms
- Midas venosus Loew, 1866

= Nemomydas venosus =

Species of fly

Nemomydas venosus is a species of mydas flies in the family Mydidae.

== Distribution ==
United States.
