= Pseudonomoneura hirta =

Scientific classification
- Kingdom: Animalia
- Phylum: Arthropoda
- Class: Insecta
- Order: Diptera
- Family: Mydidae
- Subfamily: Leptomydinae
- Genus: Pseudonomoneura
- Species: P. hirta

Binomial name
- Pseudonomoneura hirta (Coquillett, 1904)

Synonyms
- Leptomydas concinnus Coquillett, 1904; Leptomydas hirta Coquillett, 1904

Species of fly

Pseudonomoneura hirta is a species of mydas flies (insects in the family Mydidae).

== Distribution ==
California.
