= Nemomydas tenuipes =

Scientific classification
- Kingdom: Animalia
- Phylum: Arthropoda
- Class: Insecta
- Order: Diptera
- Family: Mydidae
- Subfamily: Leptomydinae
- Genus: Nemomydas
- Species: N. tenuipes

Binomial name
- Nemomydas tenuipes (Loew, 1872)

Synonyms
- Midas tenuipes Loew, 1872

Species of fly

Nemomydas tenuipes is a species of mydas flies in the family Mydidae.

== Distribution ==
California.
