= Nemomydas pantherinus =

Scientific classification
- Kingdom: Animalia
- Phylum: Arthropoda
- Class: Insecta
- Order: Diptera
- Family: Mydidae
- Subfamily: Leptomydinae
- Genus: Nemomydas
- Species: N. pantherinus

Binomial name
- Nemomydas pantherinus (Gerstäcker, 1868)

Synonyms
- Leptomydas pantherinus Gerstäcker, 1868

Species of insect

Nemomydas pantherinus is a species of mydas flies in the family Mydidae.

== Distribution ==
Canada, United States.
