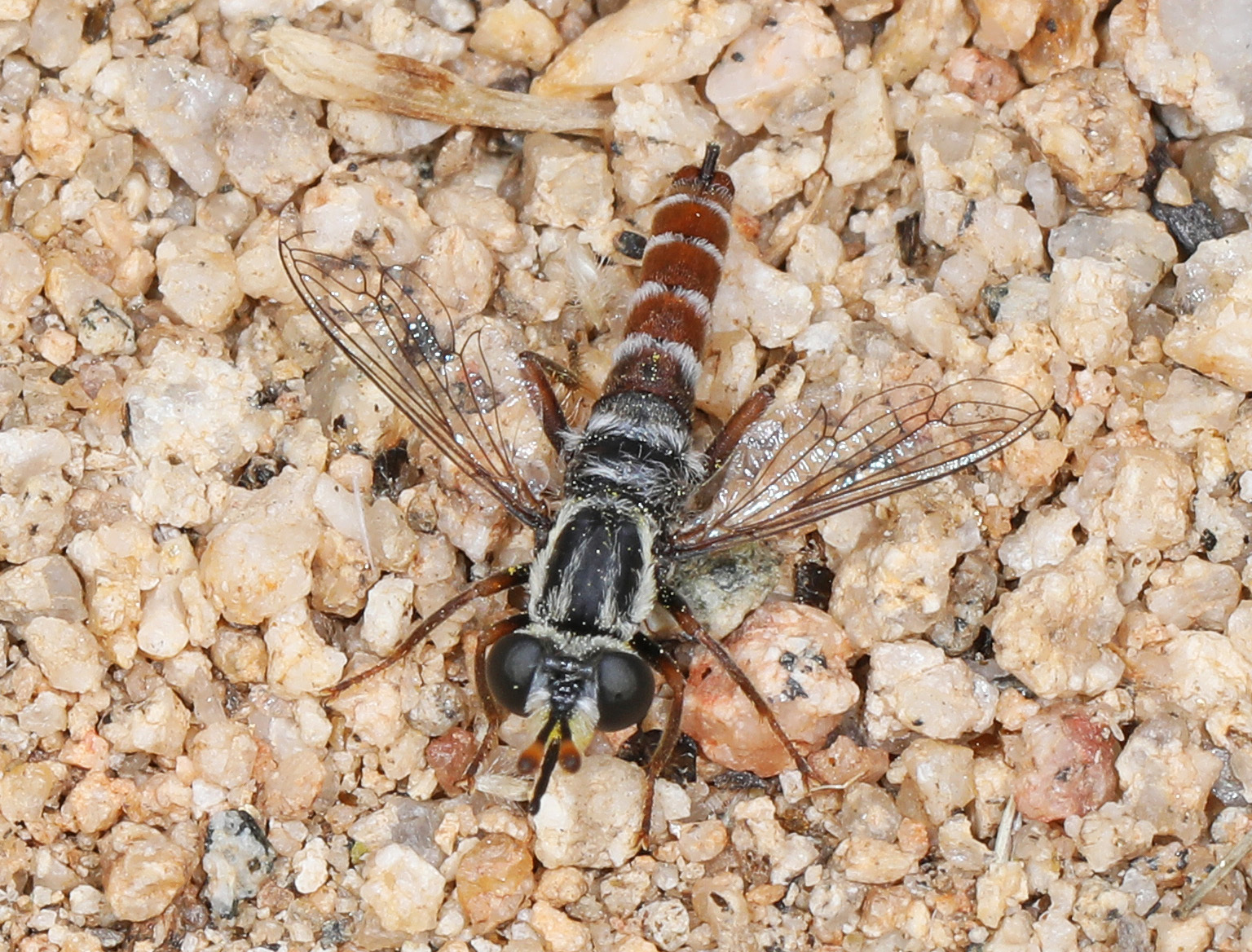

Scientific classification
- Kingdom: Animalia
- Phylum: Arthropoda
- Clade: Pancrustacea
- Class: Insecta
- Order: Diptera
- Family: Mydidae
- Subfamily: Leptomydinae
- Genus: Pseudonomoneura
- Species: P. micheneri

Binomial name
- Pseudonomoneura micheneri (James, 1938)

Synonyms
- Nomoneura micheneri James, 1938

= Pseudonomoneura micheneri =

Species of fly

Pseudonomoneura micheneri is a species of mydas flies (insects in the family Mydidae).

== Distribution ==
California.
