= Nemomydas lara =

Scientific classification
- Kingdom: Animalia
- Phylum: Arthropoda
- Class: Insecta
- Order: Diptera
- Family: Mydidae
- Subfamily: Leptomydinae
- Genus: Nemomydas
- Species: N. lara

Binomial name
- Nemomydas lara Steyskal, 1956

Species of fly

Nemomydas lara is a species of mydas flies in the family Mydidae.

== Distribution ==
It is endemic to Florida scrubs in Florida.
