= Pseudonomoneura tinkhami =

Scientific classification
- Kingdom: Animalia
- Phylum: Arthropoda
- Class: Insecta
- Order: Diptera
- Family: Mydidae
- Subfamily: Leptomydinae
- Genus: Pseudonomoneura
- Species: P. tinkhami

Binomial name
- Pseudonomoneura tinkhami (Hardy, 1950)

Synonyms
- Nomoneura tinkhami Hardy, 1950

Species of fly

Pseudonomoneura tinkhami is a species of mydas flies (insects in the family Mydidae).

== Distribution ==
Arizona.
