= Plyomydas =

Scientific classification
- Kingdom: Animalia
- Phylum: Arthropoda
- Class: Insecta
- Order: Diptera
- Family: Mydidae
- Subfamily: Leptomydinae
- Genus: Plyomydas; Papavero, 1971

Type species
- Plyomydas peruviensis Wilcox & Papavero, 1971

Synonyms
- Phyomydas Anonymous, 1975

Genus of flies

Plyomydas is a genus of flies in the family Mydidae.

== Species ==
- Plyomydas adelphe Castillo & Dikow, 2017
- Plyomydas peruviensis Wilcox & Papavero, 1971
- Plyomydas phalaros Castillo & Dikow, 2017
