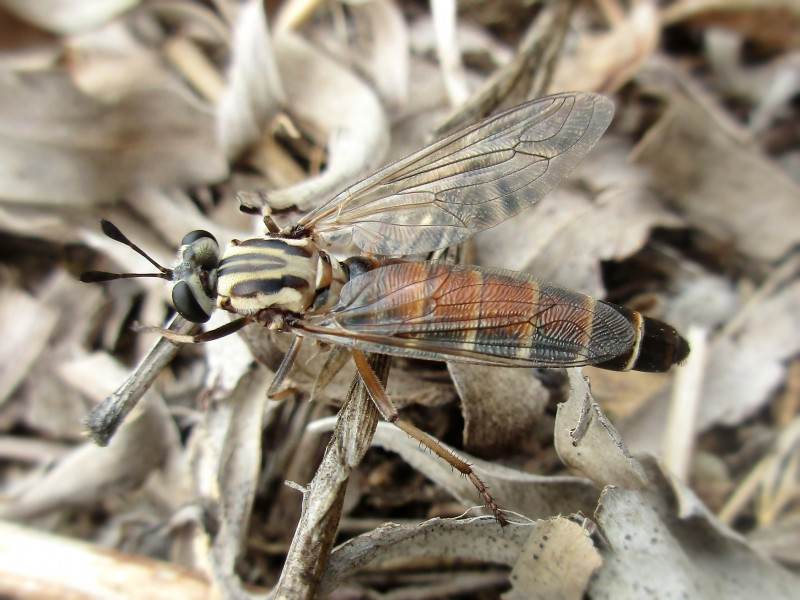
- Leptomydas sardous

Scientific classification
- Kingdom: Animalia
- Phylum: Arthropoda
- Class: Insecta
- Order: Diptera
- Family: Mydidae
- Subfamily: Leptomydinae
- Genus: Leptomydas; Gerstaecker, 1868

Type species
- Mydas lusitanicus Meigen & Wiedemann, 1820

Synonyms
- Leptomidas Loew, 1872

= Leptomydas =

Genus of flies

Leptomydas is a genus of flies in the family Mydidae that occurs in Europe and Asia.

== Species ==
- Leptomydas batyr Semenov, 1922
- Leptomydas corsicanus Béquaert, 1961
- Leptomydas danaus Bowden, 1983
- Leptomydas lineatus (Olivier, 1811)
- Leptomydas lusitanicus (Meigen & Wiedemann, 1820)
- Leptomydas maculatus (Walker, 1871)
- Leptomydas notos Dikow, 2010
- Leptomydas padishach Semenov, 1922
- Leptomydas rapti Dikow, 2010
- Leptomydas rufipes (Westwood, 1841)
- Leptomydas sardous (Costa, 1884)
- Leptomydas shach Semenov, 1922
- Leptomydas tigris Dikow, 2010
- Leptomydas turcicus Bowden, 1983
- Leptomydas tutankhameni (Brunetti, 1929)
