= Pseudonomoneura =

Scientific classification
- Kingdom: Animalia
- Phylum: Arthropoda
- Class: Insecta
- Order: Diptera
- Family: Mydidae
- Subfamily: Leptomydinae
- Genus: Pseudonomoneura; Bequaert, 1961

Type species
- Leptomydas hirtus Coquillett, 1904

Genus of flies

Pseudonomoneura is a genus of flies in the family Mydidae.

== Species ==
- Pseudonomoneura bajaensis Fitzgerald & Kondratieff, 1995
- Pseudonomoneura calderwoodi Fitzgerald & Kondratieff, 1997
- Pseudonomoneura californica (Hardy, 1950)
- Pseudonomoneura hirta (Coquillett, 1904)
- Pseudonomoneura micheneri (James, 1938)
- Pseudonomoneura nelsoni Fitzgerald & Kondratieff, 1995
- Pseudonomoneura tinkhami (Hardy, 1950)
