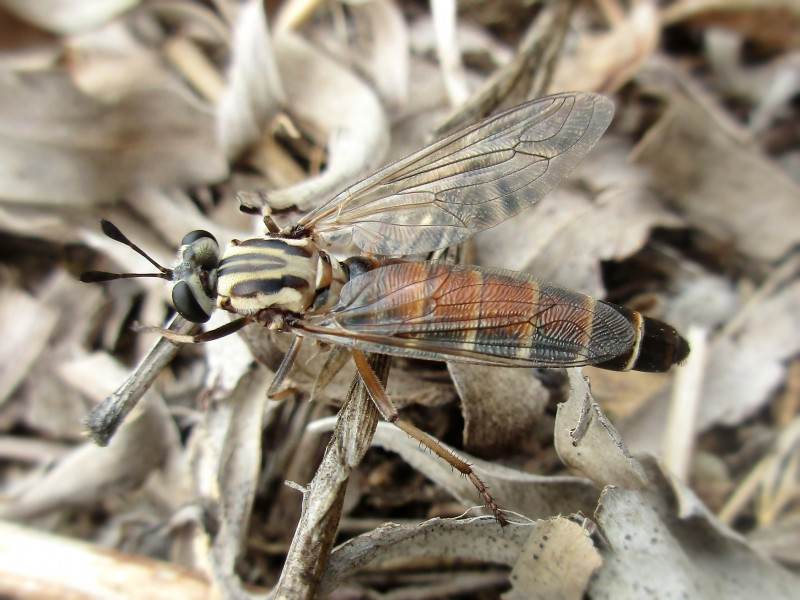

Scientific classification
- Kingdom: Animalia
- Phylum: Arthropoda
- Class: Insecta
- Order: Diptera
- Family: Mydidae
- Subfamily: Leptomydinae
- Genus: Leptomydas
- Species: L. sardous

Binomial name
- Leptomydas sardous (Costa, 1884)

Synonyms
- Mydas sardous Costa, 1884

= Leptomydas sardous =

Species of fly

Leptomydas sardous is a species of mydas flies (insects in the family Mydidae).

== Distribution ==
Sardinia.
