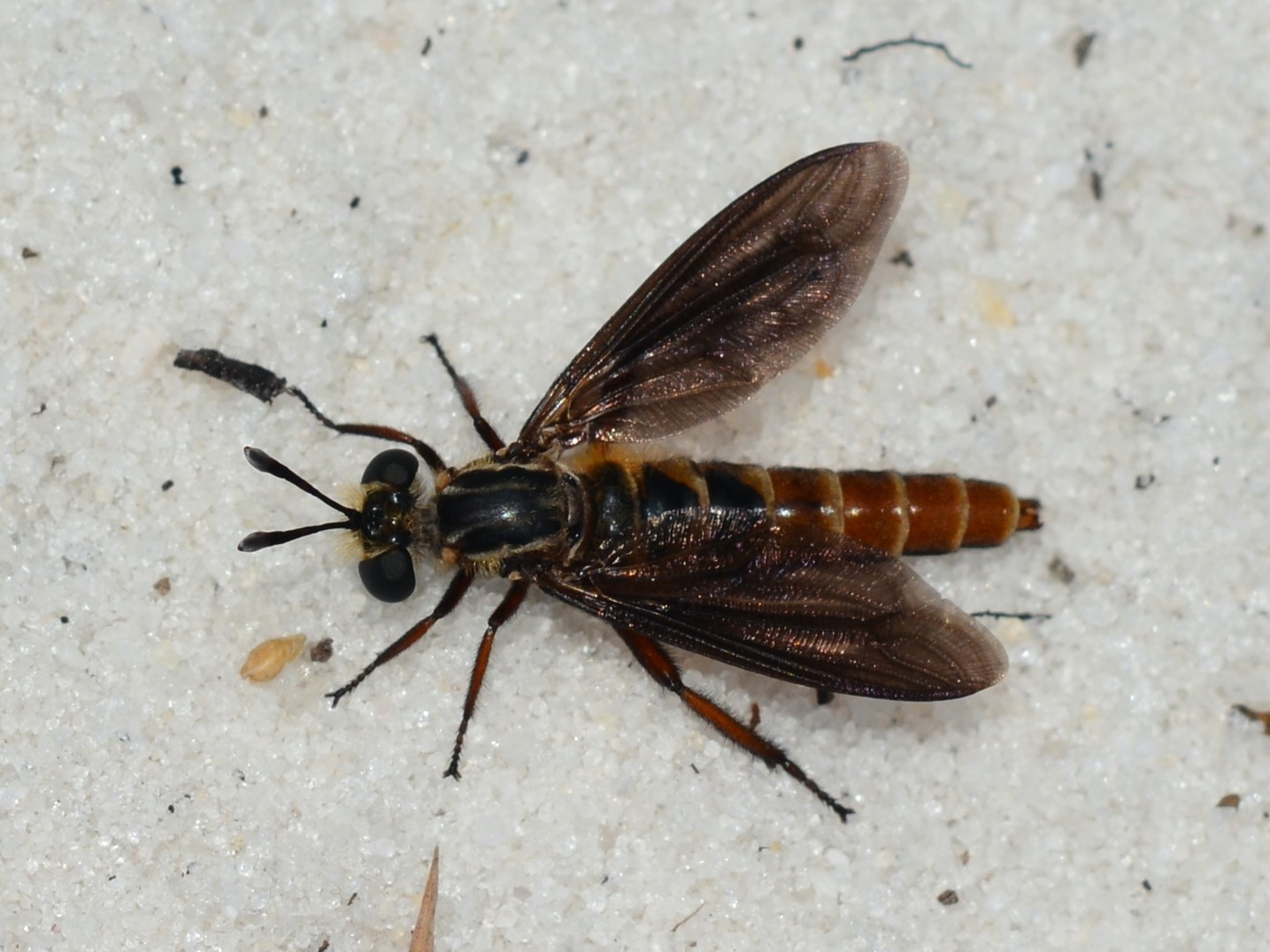
- Nemomydas jonesii

Scientific classification
- Kingdom: Animalia
- Phylum: Arthropoda
- Class: Insecta
- Order: Diptera
- Family: Mydidae
- Subfamily: Leptomydinae
- Genus: Nemomydas; Curran, 1934

Type species
- Leptomydas pantherinus Gerstaecker, 1868

= Nemomydas =

Genus of flies

Nemomydas is a genus of flies in the family Mydidae.

== Species ==
- Nemomydas alifoleyae Fitzgerald & Kondratieff, 1998
- Nemomydas bequaerti (Johnson, 1926)
- Nemomydas bifidus Hardy, 1950
- Nemomydas brachyrhynchus (Osten Sacken, 1886)
- Nemomydas desideratus (Johnson, 1912)
- Nemomydas dominicanus Kondratieff & Pérez-Gelabert, 2004
- Nemomydas fronki Kondratieff & Welch, 1990
- Nemomydas fumosus Hardy, 1950
- Nemomydas hooki Welch & Kondratieff, 1991
- Nemomydas intonsus Hardy, 1950
- Nemomydas jonesii (Johnson, 1926)
- Nemomydas lamia (Séguy, 1928)
- Nemomydas lara Steyskal, 1956
- Nemomydas loreni Welch & Kondratieff, 1991
- Nemomydas melanopogon Steyskal, 1956
- Nemomydas panamensis (Curran, 1934)
- Nemomydas pantherinus (Gerstaecker, 1868)
- Nemomydas senilis (Westwood, 1841)
- Nemomydas solitarius (Johnson, 1926)
- Nemomydas sponsor (Osten Sacken, 1886)
- Nemomydas tenuipes (Loew, 1872)
- Nemomydas venosus (Loew, 1866)
- Nemomydas wendyae Kondratieff & Welch, 1990
