= Eremomidas =

Scientific classification
- Kingdom: Animalia
- Phylum: Arthropoda
- Class: Insecta
- Order: Diptera
- Family: Mydidae
- Subfamily: Leptomydinae
- Genus: Eremomidas; Semenov, 1896

Type species
- Eremomidas emir Semenov, 1896

Synonyms
- Eremomydas Bezzi, 1903; Eremomydas Semenov, 1902

Genus of flies

Eremomidas is a genus of flies in the family Mydidae.

== Species ==
- Eremomidas arabicus Béquaert, 1961
- Eremomidas chan Semenov, 1896
- Eremomidas emir Semenov, 1896
