= Hessemydas =

Scientific classification
- Kingdom: Animalia
- Phylum: Arthropoda
- Class: Insecta
- Order: Diptera
- Family: Mydidae
- Subfamily: Leptomydinae
- Genus: Hessemydas; Carr & Irwin, 2005

Type species
- Hessemydas parkeri Kondratieff, Carr & Irwin, 2005

Genus of flies

Hessemydas is a genus of flies in the family Mydidae.

== Species ==
- Hessemydas daugeroni Kondratieff, 2009
- Hessemydas parkeri Kondratieff, Carr & Irwin, 2005
- Hessemydas seyrigi (Séguy, 1960)
- Hessemydas tulear Kondratieff, Carr & Irwin, 2005
