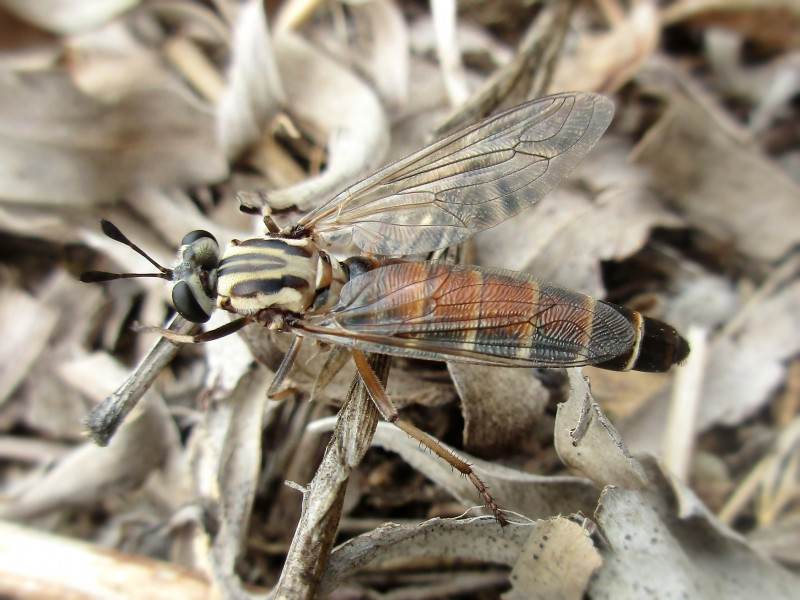
- Leptomydas sardous

Scientific classification
- Domain: Eukaryota
- Kingdom: Animalia
- Phylum: Arthropoda
- Class: Insecta
- Order: Diptera
- Superfamily: Asiloidea
- Family: Mydidae
- Subfamily: Leptomydinae

= Leptomydinae =

Subfamily of flies

Leptomydinae is a subfamily of mydas flies in the family Mydidae primarily distributed in the Northern Hemisphere.

== Genera ==
- Eremomidas Semenov, 1896
- Hessemydas Carr & Irwin, 2005
- Leptomydas Gerstaecker, 1868
- Nemomydas Curran, 1934
- Plyomydas Papavero, 1971
- Pseudonomoneura Bequaert, 1961
